

190001–190100 

|-bgcolor=#fefefe
| 190001 ||  || — || April 21, 2004 || Socorro || LINEAR || FLO || align=right data-sort-value="0.99" | 990 m || 
|-id=002 bgcolor=#fefefe
| 190002 ||  || — || May 9, 2004 || Kitt Peak || Spacewatch || — || align=right | 1.3 km || 
|-id=003 bgcolor=#fefefe
| 190003 ||  || — || May 15, 2004 || Socorro || LINEAR || — || align=right | 1.4 km || 
|-id=004 bgcolor=#fefefe
| 190004 ||  || — || May 18, 2004 || Socorro || LINEAR || NYS || align=right data-sort-value="0.87" | 870 m || 
|-id=005 bgcolor=#C2FFFF
| 190005 ||  || — || May 19, 2004 || Kitt Peak || Spacewatch || L4 || align=right | 14 km || 
|-id=006 bgcolor=#fefefe
| 190006 ||  || — || June 11, 2004 || Palomar || NEAT || — || align=right | 1.4 km || 
|-id=007 bgcolor=#fefefe
| 190007 ||  || — || June 11, 2004 || Socorro || LINEAR || NYS || align=right | 1.1 km || 
|-id=008 bgcolor=#fefefe
| 190008 ||  || — || June 11, 2004 || Socorro || LINEAR || NYS || align=right | 1.1 km || 
|-id=009 bgcolor=#fefefe
| 190009 ||  || — || June 11, 2004 || Socorro || LINEAR || — || align=right | 1.4 km || 
|-id=010 bgcolor=#fefefe
| 190010 ||  || — || June 27, 2004 || Reedy Creek || J. Broughton || — || align=right | 1.6 km || 
|-id=011 bgcolor=#fefefe
| 190011 ||  || — || July 9, 2004 || Socorro || LINEAR || LCI || align=right | 1.8 km || 
|-id=012 bgcolor=#fefefe
| 190012 ||  || — || July 9, 2004 || Palomar || NEAT || — || align=right | 1.6 km || 
|-id=013 bgcolor=#fefefe
| 190013 ||  || — || July 11, 2004 || Socorro || LINEAR || — || align=right | 1.6 km || 
|-id=014 bgcolor=#fefefe
| 190014 ||  || — || July 11, 2004 || Socorro || LINEAR || — || align=right | 1.9 km || 
|-id=015 bgcolor=#E9E9E9
| 190015 ||  || — || July 11, 2004 || Socorro || LINEAR || — || align=right | 1.4 km || 
|-id=016 bgcolor=#E9E9E9
| 190016 ||  || — || July 20, 2004 || Reedy Creek || J. Broughton || — || align=right | 1.9 km || 
|-id=017 bgcolor=#E9E9E9
| 190017 ||  || — || August 7, 2004 || Palomar || NEAT || — || align=right | 1.5 km || 
|-id=018 bgcolor=#E9E9E9
| 190018 ||  || — || August 7, 2004 || Campo Imperatore || CINEOS || — || align=right | 4.4 km || 
|-id=019 bgcolor=#E9E9E9
| 190019 ||  || — || August 8, 2004 || Anderson Mesa || LONEOS || — || align=right | 2.6 km || 
|-id=020 bgcolor=#E9E9E9
| 190020 ||  || — || August 8, 2004 || Anderson Mesa || LONEOS || — || align=right | 1.5 km || 
|-id=021 bgcolor=#E9E9E9
| 190021 ||  || — || August 8, 2004 || Anderson Mesa || LONEOS || — || align=right | 3.8 km || 
|-id=022 bgcolor=#E9E9E9
| 190022 ||  || — || August 9, 2004 || Socorro || LINEAR || — || align=right | 1.1 km || 
|-id=023 bgcolor=#E9E9E9
| 190023 ||  || — || August 10, 2004 || Socorro || LINEAR || — || align=right | 3.1 km || 
|-id=024 bgcolor=#E9E9E9
| 190024 ||  || — || August 11, 2004 || Palomar || NEAT || — || align=right | 3.3 km || 
|-id=025 bgcolor=#E9E9E9
| 190025 ||  || — || August 12, 2004 || Socorro || LINEAR || — || align=right | 3.1 km || 
|-id=026 bgcolor=#E9E9E9
| 190026 Iskorosten || 2004 QJ ||  || August 16, 2004 || Andrushivka || Andrushivka Obs. || — || align=right | 2.8 km || 
|-id=027 bgcolor=#E9E9E9
| 190027 ||  || — || August 21, 2004 || Siding Spring || SSS || MAR || align=right | 2.0 km || 
|-id=028 bgcolor=#fefefe
| 190028 ||  || — || August 19, 2004 || Socorro || LINEAR || — || align=right | 1.7 km || 
|-id=029 bgcolor=#E9E9E9
| 190029 ||  || — || August 25, 2004 || Socorro || LINEAR || BAR || align=right | 2.3 km || 
|-id=030 bgcolor=#E9E9E9
| 190030 ||  || — || September 3, 2004 || Palomar || NEAT || — || align=right | 1.5 km || 
|-id=031 bgcolor=#E9E9E9
| 190031 ||  || — || September 7, 2004 || Kitt Peak || Spacewatch || — || align=right | 3.0 km || 
|-id=032 bgcolor=#d6d6d6
| 190032 ||  || — || September 7, 2004 || Kitt Peak || Spacewatch || — || align=right | 5.1 km || 
|-id=033 bgcolor=#E9E9E9
| 190033 ||  || — || September 8, 2004 || Socorro || LINEAR || MAR || align=right | 2.0 km || 
|-id=034 bgcolor=#E9E9E9
| 190034 ||  || — || September 8, 2004 || Socorro || LINEAR || — || align=right | 1.5 km || 
|-id=035 bgcolor=#E9E9E9
| 190035 ||  || — || September 8, 2004 || Socorro || LINEAR || — || align=right | 1.5 km || 
|-id=036 bgcolor=#E9E9E9
| 190036 ||  || — || September 8, 2004 || Socorro || LINEAR || — || align=right | 2.5 km || 
|-id=037 bgcolor=#E9E9E9
| 190037 ||  || — || September 8, 2004 || Socorro || LINEAR || — || align=right | 4.5 km || 
|-id=038 bgcolor=#E9E9E9
| 190038 ||  || — || September 7, 2004 || Palomar || NEAT || — || align=right | 2.5 km || 
|-id=039 bgcolor=#E9E9E9
| 190039 ||  || — || September 8, 2004 || Socorro || LINEAR || — || align=right | 1.3 km || 
|-id=040 bgcolor=#E9E9E9
| 190040 ||  || — || September 8, 2004 || Palomar || NEAT || WIT || align=right | 1.9 km || 
|-id=041 bgcolor=#E9E9E9
| 190041 ||  || — || September 8, 2004 || Palomar || NEAT || — || align=right | 3.9 km || 
|-id=042 bgcolor=#E9E9E9
| 190042 ||  || — || September 6, 2004 || Socorro || LINEAR || — || align=right | 3.3 km || 
|-id=043 bgcolor=#E9E9E9
| 190043 ||  || — || September 6, 2004 || Socorro || LINEAR || — || align=right | 4.3 km || 
|-id=044 bgcolor=#E9E9E9
| 190044 ||  || — || September 6, 2004 || Socorro || LINEAR || JUN || align=right | 2.1 km || 
|-id=045 bgcolor=#E9E9E9
| 190045 ||  || — || September 7, 2004 || Palomar || NEAT || — || align=right | 2.5 km || 
|-id=046 bgcolor=#E9E9E9
| 190046 ||  || — || September 9, 2004 || Socorro || LINEAR || — || align=right | 2.4 km || 
|-id=047 bgcolor=#E9E9E9
| 190047 ||  || — || September 10, 2004 || Socorro || LINEAR || MAR || align=right | 1.7 km || 
|-id=048 bgcolor=#E9E9E9
| 190048 ||  || — || September 10, 2004 || Socorro || LINEAR || ADE || align=right | 4.5 km || 
|-id=049 bgcolor=#E9E9E9
| 190049 ||  || — || September 8, 2004 || Socorro || LINEAR || — || align=right | 1.0 km || 
|-id=050 bgcolor=#E9E9E9
| 190050 ||  || — || September 9, 2004 || Socorro || LINEAR || — || align=right | 1.8 km || 
|-id=051 bgcolor=#E9E9E9
| 190051 ||  || — || September 10, 2004 || Socorro || LINEAR || — || align=right | 2.0 km || 
|-id=052 bgcolor=#E9E9E9
| 190052 ||  || — || September 10, 2004 || Socorro || LINEAR || WIT || align=right | 1.6 km || 
|-id=053 bgcolor=#E9E9E9
| 190053 ||  || — || September 10, 2004 || Socorro || LINEAR || — || align=right | 2.1 km || 
|-id=054 bgcolor=#E9E9E9
| 190054 ||  || — || September 10, 2004 || Socorro || LINEAR || — || align=right | 2.2 km || 
|-id=055 bgcolor=#E9E9E9
| 190055 ||  || — || September 11, 2004 || Socorro || LINEAR || — || align=right | 3.5 km || 
|-id=056 bgcolor=#E9E9E9
| 190056 ||  || — || September 13, 2004 || Kitt Peak || Spacewatch || — || align=right | 2.0 km || 
|-id=057 bgcolor=#E9E9E9
| 190057 Nakagawa ||  ||  || September 14, 2004 || Nakagawa || H. Hori, H. Maeno || — || align=right | 2.9 km || 
|-id=058 bgcolor=#E9E9E9
| 190058 ||  || — || September 9, 2004 || Anderson Mesa || LONEOS || — || align=right | 2.2 km || 
|-id=059 bgcolor=#FA8072
| 190059 ||  || — || September 12, 2004 || Socorro || LINEAR || — || align=right | 2.1 km || 
|-id=060 bgcolor=#E9E9E9
| 190060 ||  || — || September 12, 2004 || Socorro || LINEAR || — || align=right | 3.1 km || 
|-id=061 bgcolor=#E9E9E9
| 190061 ||  || — || September 15, 2004 || Kitt Peak || Spacewatch || — || align=right | 2.1 km || 
|-id=062 bgcolor=#E9E9E9
| 190062 ||  || — || September 9, 2004 || Socorro || LINEAR || — || align=right | 2.6 km || 
|-id=063 bgcolor=#E9E9E9
| 190063 ||  || — || September 12, 2004 || Kitt Peak || Spacewatch || — || align=right | 2.5 km || 
|-id=064 bgcolor=#E9E9E9
| 190064 ||  || — || September 13, 2004 || Socorro || LINEAR || — || align=right | 3.3 km || 
|-id=065 bgcolor=#E9E9E9
| 190065 ||  || — || September 13, 2004 || Socorro || LINEAR || — || align=right | 3.5 km || 
|-id=066 bgcolor=#E9E9E9
| 190066 ||  || — || September 13, 2004 || Socorro || LINEAR || — || align=right | 2.5 km || 
|-id=067 bgcolor=#E9E9E9
| 190067 ||  || — || September 14, 2004 || Socorro || LINEAR || EUN || align=right | 2.2 km || 
|-id=068 bgcolor=#E9E9E9
| 190068 ||  || — || September 14, 2004 || Palomar || NEAT || — || align=right | 3.0 km || 
|-id=069 bgcolor=#E9E9E9
| 190069 ||  || — || September 14, 2004 || Palomar || NEAT || — || align=right | 4.7 km || 
|-id=070 bgcolor=#E9E9E9
| 190070 ||  || — || September 9, 2004 || Socorro || LINEAR || — || align=right | 1.9 km || 
|-id=071 bgcolor=#E9E9E9
| 190071 ||  || — || September 17, 2004 || Anderson Mesa || LONEOS || MAR || align=right | 1.9 km || 
|-id=072 bgcolor=#E9E9E9
| 190072 ||  || — || September 17, 2004 || Kitt Peak || Spacewatch || HEN || align=right | 1.5 km || 
|-id=073 bgcolor=#E9E9E9
| 190073 ||  || — || September 18, 2004 || Socorro || LINEAR || — || align=right | 3.4 km || 
|-id=074 bgcolor=#E9E9E9
| 190074 ||  || — || September 18, 2004 || Socorro || LINEAR || ADE || align=right | 4.1 km || 
|-id=075 bgcolor=#E9E9E9
| 190075 ||  || — || September 16, 2004 || Anderson Mesa || LONEOS || — || align=right | 1.3 km || 
|-id=076 bgcolor=#E9E9E9
| 190076 ||  || — || September 16, 2004 || Anderson Mesa || LONEOS || HEN || align=right | 1.5 km || 
|-id=077 bgcolor=#E9E9E9
| 190077 ||  || — || October 4, 2004 || Goodricke-Pigott || R. A. Tucker || — || align=right | 3.0 km || 
|-id=078 bgcolor=#E9E9E9
| 190078 ||  || — || October 10, 2004 || Socorro || LINEAR || — || align=right | 2.7 km || 
|-id=079 bgcolor=#E9E9E9
| 190079 ||  || — || October 3, 2004 || Palomar || NEAT || — || align=right | 3.8 km || 
|-id=080 bgcolor=#E9E9E9
| 190080 ||  || — || October 4, 2004 || Kitt Peak || Spacewatch || — || align=right | 2.5 km || 
|-id=081 bgcolor=#E9E9E9
| 190081 ||  || — || October 4, 2004 || Kitt Peak || Spacewatch || — || align=right | 3.3 km || 
|-id=082 bgcolor=#E9E9E9
| 190082 ||  || — || October 4, 2004 || Kitt Peak || Spacewatch || MIS || align=right | 3.3 km || 
|-id=083 bgcolor=#E9E9E9
| 190083 ||  || — || October 4, 2004 || Anderson Mesa || LONEOS || EUN || align=right | 2.3 km || 
|-id=084 bgcolor=#E9E9E9
| 190084 ||  || — || October 5, 2004 || Kitt Peak || Spacewatch || — || align=right | 3.3 km || 
|-id=085 bgcolor=#E9E9E9
| 190085 ||  || — || October 7, 2004 || Socorro || LINEAR || — || align=right | 3.7 km || 
|-id=086 bgcolor=#E9E9E9
| 190086 ||  || — || October 7, 2004 || Palomar || NEAT || — || align=right | 3.2 km || 
|-id=087 bgcolor=#E9E9E9
| 190087 ||  || — || October 7, 2004 || Socorro || LINEAR || — || align=right | 4.4 km || 
|-id=088 bgcolor=#E9E9E9
| 190088 ||  || — || October 7, 2004 || Palomar || NEAT || MRX || align=right | 2.1 km || 
|-id=089 bgcolor=#E9E9E9
| 190089 ||  || — || October 8, 2004 || Anderson Mesa || LONEOS || WIT || align=right | 1.7 km || 
|-id=090 bgcolor=#E9E9E9
| 190090 ||  || — || October 8, 2004 || Anderson Mesa || LONEOS || — || align=right | 3.1 km || 
|-id=091 bgcolor=#E9E9E9
| 190091 ||  || — || October 8, 2004 || Anderson Mesa || LONEOS || — || align=right | 4.7 km || 
|-id=092 bgcolor=#E9E9E9
| 190092 ||  || — || October 4, 2004 || Kitt Peak || Spacewatch || — || align=right | 2.8 km || 
|-id=093 bgcolor=#d6d6d6
| 190093 ||  || — || October 6, 2004 || Kitt Peak || Spacewatch || HYG || align=right | 2.8 km || 
|-id=094 bgcolor=#d6d6d6
| 190094 ||  || — || October 6, 2004 || Kitt Peak || Spacewatch || KOR || align=right | 1.8 km || 
|-id=095 bgcolor=#E9E9E9
| 190095 ||  || — || October 8, 2004 || Socorro || LINEAR || GEF || align=right | 2.5 km || 
|-id=096 bgcolor=#E9E9E9
| 190096 ||  || — || October 7, 2004 || Kitt Peak || Spacewatch || — || align=right | 2.9 km || 
|-id=097 bgcolor=#E9E9E9
| 190097 ||  || — || October 7, 2004 || Socorro || LINEAR || ADE || align=right | 3.2 km || 
|-id=098 bgcolor=#E9E9E9
| 190098 ||  || — || October 8, 2004 || Kitt Peak || Spacewatch || AGN || align=right | 1.5 km || 
|-id=099 bgcolor=#E9E9E9
| 190099 ||  || — || October 10, 2004 || Socorro || LINEAR || — || align=right | 3.8 km || 
|-id=100 bgcolor=#E9E9E9
| 190100 ||  || — || October 9, 2004 || Kitt Peak || Spacewatch || — || align=right | 3.8 km || 
|}

190101–190200 

|-bgcolor=#d6d6d6
| 190101 ||  || — || October 9, 2004 || Kitt Peak || Spacewatch || KOR || align=right | 2.2 km || 
|-id=102 bgcolor=#E9E9E9
| 190102 ||  || — || October 9, 2004 || Kitt Peak || Spacewatch || GEF || align=right | 1.7 km || 
|-id=103 bgcolor=#E9E9E9
| 190103 ||  || — || October 8, 2004 || Socorro || LINEAR || — || align=right | 2.9 km || 
|-id=104 bgcolor=#E9E9E9
| 190104 ||  || — || October 9, 2004 || Socorro || LINEAR || JUN || align=right | 2.2 km || 
|-id=105 bgcolor=#E9E9E9
| 190105 ||  || — || October 10, 2004 || Kitt Peak || Spacewatch || HEN || align=right | 1.3 km || 
|-id=106 bgcolor=#E9E9E9
| 190106 ||  || — || October 10, 2004 || Socorro || LINEAR || DOR || align=right | 4.2 km || 
|-id=107 bgcolor=#d6d6d6
| 190107 ||  || — || October 9, 2004 || Kitt Peak || Spacewatch || EMA || align=right | 4.1 km || 
|-id=108 bgcolor=#d6d6d6
| 190108 ||  || — || October 14, 2004 || Kitt Peak || Spacewatch || K-2 || align=right | 2.2 km || 
|-id=109 bgcolor=#E9E9E9
| 190109 ||  || — || October 7, 2004 || Socorro || LINEAR || — || align=right | 2.8 km || 
|-id=110 bgcolor=#E9E9E9
| 190110 ||  || — || October 10, 2004 || Palomar || NEAT || — || align=right | 2.6 km || 
|-id=111 bgcolor=#E9E9E9
| 190111 ||  || — || October 14, 2004 || Anderson Mesa || LONEOS || — || align=right | 2.1 km || 
|-id=112 bgcolor=#d6d6d6
| 190112 ||  || — || October 10, 2004 || Kitt Peak || Spacewatch || KOR || align=right | 2.1 km || 
|-id=113 bgcolor=#E9E9E9
| 190113 ||  || — || October 18, 2004 || Socorro || LINEAR || — || align=right | 3.5 km || 
|-id=114 bgcolor=#d6d6d6
| 190114 ||  || — || November 3, 2004 || Catalina || CSS || — || align=right | 5.0 km || 
|-id=115 bgcolor=#E9E9E9
| 190115 ||  || — || November 4, 2004 || Socorro || LINEAR || EUN || align=right | 2.1 km || 
|-id=116 bgcolor=#d6d6d6
| 190116 ||  || — || November 3, 2004 || Kitt Peak || Spacewatch || — || align=right | 5.7 km || 
|-id=117 bgcolor=#E9E9E9
| 190117 ||  || — || November 5, 2004 || Socorro || LINEAR || MIT || align=right | 4.5 km || 
|-id=118 bgcolor=#E9E9E9
| 190118 ||  || — || November 10, 2004 || Wrightwood || J. W. Young || — || align=right | 4.4 km || 
|-id=119 bgcolor=#FFC2E0
| 190119 ||  || — || November 10, 2004 || Socorro || LINEAR || APO +1km || align=right | 1.5 km || 
|-id=120 bgcolor=#d6d6d6
| 190120 ||  || — || November 9, 2004 || Catalina || CSS || — || align=right | 4.8 km || 
|-id=121 bgcolor=#d6d6d6
| 190121 ||  || — || November 19, 2004 || Catalina || CSS || — || align=right | 3.0 km || 
|-id=122 bgcolor=#d6d6d6
| 190122 ||  || — || November 30, 2004 || Palomar || NEAT || — || align=right | 4.3 km || 
|-id=123 bgcolor=#E9E9E9
| 190123 ||  || — || December 2, 2004 || Socorro || LINEAR || — || align=right | 2.9 km || 
|-id=124 bgcolor=#d6d6d6
| 190124 ||  || — || December 10, 2004 || Pla D'Arguines || R. Ferrando || — || align=right | 3.0 km || 
|-id=125 bgcolor=#d6d6d6
| 190125 ||  || — || December 12, 2004 || Kitt Peak || Spacewatch || — || align=right | 5.4 km || 
|-id=126 bgcolor=#d6d6d6
| 190126 ||  || — || December 11, 2004 || Campo Imperatore || CINEOS || KOR || align=right | 2.3 km || 
|-id=127 bgcolor=#d6d6d6
| 190127 ||  || — || December 17, 2004 || Socorro || LINEAR || EOS || align=right | 4.0 km || 
|-id=128 bgcolor=#d6d6d6
| 190128 ||  || — || December 18, 2004 || Socorro || LINEAR || — || align=right | 3.4 km || 
|-id=129 bgcolor=#d6d6d6
| 190129 ||  || — || February 1, 2005 || Kitt Peak || Spacewatch || — || align=right | 3.9 km || 
|-id=130 bgcolor=#d6d6d6
| 190130 ||  || — || February 4, 2005 || Antares || ARO || — || align=right | 7.0 km || 
|-id=131 bgcolor=#d6d6d6
| 190131 ||  || — || February 4, 2005 || Socorro || LINEAR || — || align=right | 7.7 km || 
|-id=132 bgcolor=#fefefe
| 190132 ||  || — || May 4, 2005 || Catalina || CSS || H || align=right data-sort-value="0.85" | 850 m || 
|-id=133 bgcolor=#d6d6d6
| 190133 ||  || — || June 11, 2005 || Kitt Peak || Spacewatch || EOS || align=right | 2.8 km || 
|-id=134 bgcolor=#E9E9E9
| 190134 ||  || — || July 9, 2005 || Kitt Peak || Spacewatch || — || align=right | 1.2 km || 
|-id=135 bgcolor=#FFC2E0
| 190135 ||  || — || August 26, 2005 || Palomar || NEAT || APO +1km || align=right | 1.4 km || 
|-id=136 bgcolor=#fefefe
| 190136 ||  || — || August 26, 2005 || Palomar || NEAT || — || align=right data-sort-value="0.91" | 910 m || 
|-id=137 bgcolor=#fefefe
| 190137 ||  || — || August 30, 2005 || Palomar || NEAT || — || align=right | 1.2 km || 
|-id=138 bgcolor=#fefefe
| 190138 ||  || — || September 10, 2005 || Anderson Mesa || LONEOS || V || align=right | 1.2 km || 
|-id=139 bgcolor=#fefefe
| 190139 Hansküng ||  ||  || September 14, 2005 || Vallemare di Borbona || V. S. Casulli || — || align=right data-sort-value="0.89" | 890 m || 
|-id=140 bgcolor=#fefefe
| 190140 ||  || — || September 23, 2005 || Kitt Peak || Spacewatch || — || align=right | 1.0 km || 
|-id=141 bgcolor=#fefefe
| 190141 ||  || — || September 26, 2005 || Kitt Peak || Spacewatch || — || align=right | 1.1 km || 
|-id=142 bgcolor=#fefefe
| 190142 ||  || — || September 26, 2005 || Kitt Peak || Spacewatch || V || align=right data-sort-value="0.95" | 950 m || 
|-id=143 bgcolor=#fefefe
| 190143 ||  || — || September 29, 2005 || Anderson Mesa || LONEOS || — || align=right data-sort-value="0.98" | 980 m || 
|-id=144 bgcolor=#fefefe
| 190144 ||  || — || September 25, 2005 || Kitt Peak || Spacewatch || — || align=right | 1.3 km || 
|-id=145 bgcolor=#fefefe
| 190145 ||  || — || September 27, 2005 || Palomar || NEAT || FLO || align=right data-sort-value="0.98" | 980 m || 
|-id=146 bgcolor=#fefefe
| 190146 ||  || — || September 29, 2005 || Anderson Mesa || LONEOS || — || align=right data-sort-value="0.93" | 930 m || 
|-id=147 bgcolor=#fefefe
| 190147 ||  || — || September 29, 2005 || Anderson Mesa || LONEOS || — || align=right data-sort-value="0.92" | 920 m || 
|-id=148 bgcolor=#fefefe
| 190148 ||  || — || September 30, 2005 || Kitt Peak || Spacewatch || — || align=right | 1.1 km || 
|-id=149 bgcolor=#fefefe
| 190149 ||  || — || September 30, 2005 || Mount Lemmon || Mount Lemmon Survey || — || align=right data-sort-value="0.86" | 860 m || 
|-id=150 bgcolor=#fefefe
| 190150 ||  || — || September 30, 2005 || Catalina || CSS || — || align=right | 2.2 km || 
|-id=151 bgcolor=#fefefe
| 190151 ||  || — || September 18, 2005 || Palomar || NEAT || — || align=right | 1.2 km || 
|-id=152 bgcolor=#fefefe
| 190152 ||  || — || October 1, 2005 || Anderson Mesa || LONEOS || — || align=right | 1.3 km || 
|-id=153 bgcolor=#fefefe
| 190153 ||  || — || October 3, 2005 || Catalina || CSS || FLO || align=right data-sort-value="0.77" | 770 m || 
|-id=154 bgcolor=#fefefe
| 190154 ||  || — || October 3, 2005 || Socorro || LINEAR || — || align=right | 1.1 km || 
|-id=155 bgcolor=#fefefe
| 190155 ||  || — || October 8, 2005 || Socorro || LINEAR || FLO || align=right data-sort-value="0.92" | 920 m || 
|-id=156 bgcolor=#fefefe
| 190156 ||  || — || October 8, 2005 || Catalina || CSS || V || align=right data-sort-value="0.90" | 900 m || 
|-id=157 bgcolor=#fefefe
| 190157 ||  || — || October 10, 2005 || Kitt Peak || Spacewatch || — || align=right | 1.2 km || 
|-id=158 bgcolor=#fefefe
| 190158 ||  || — || October 7, 2005 || Socorro || LINEAR || V || align=right | 1.0 km || 
|-id=159 bgcolor=#fefefe
| 190159 ||  || — || October 13, 2005 || Socorro || LINEAR || FLO || align=right data-sort-value="0.96" | 960 m || 
|-id=160 bgcolor=#fefefe
| 190160 ||  || — || October 13, 2005 || Socorro || LINEAR || — || align=right | 1.3 km || 
|-id=161 bgcolor=#FFC2E0
| 190161 ||  || — || October 7, 2005 || Socorro || LINEAR || AMO +1km || align=right | 3.0 km || 
|-id=162 bgcolor=#fefefe
| 190162 ||  || — || October 22, 2005 || Catalina || CSS || — || align=right | 1.1 km || 
|-id=163 bgcolor=#fefefe
| 190163 ||  || — || October 23, 2005 || Catalina || CSS || V || align=right data-sort-value="0.96" | 960 m || 
|-id=164 bgcolor=#fefefe
| 190164 ||  || — || October 25, 2005 || Anderson Mesa || LONEOS || — || align=right | 1.4 km || 
|-id=165 bgcolor=#fefefe
| 190165 ||  || — || October 23, 2005 || Palomar || NEAT || NYS || align=right data-sort-value="0.87" | 870 m || 
|-id=166 bgcolor=#FFC2E0
| 190166 ||  || — || October 31, 2005 || Kitt Peak || Spacewatch || AMO +1kmmoon || align=right | 1.0 km || 
|-id=167 bgcolor=#fefefe
| 190167 ||  || — || October 26, 2005 || Gnosca || S. Sposetti || — || align=right | 1.1 km || 
|-id=168 bgcolor=#fefefe
| 190168 ||  || — || October 24, 2005 || Kitt Peak || Spacewatch || — || align=right | 1.0 km || 
|-id=169 bgcolor=#fefefe
| 190169 ||  || — || October 27, 2005 || Mount Lemmon || Mount Lemmon Survey || MAS || align=right data-sort-value="0.91" | 910 m || 
|-id=170 bgcolor=#fefefe
| 190170 ||  || — || October 25, 2005 || Kitt Peak || Spacewatch || — || align=right | 1.3 km || 
|-id=171 bgcolor=#fefefe
| 190171 ||  || — || October 25, 2005 || Kitt Peak || Spacewatch || — || align=right | 1.1 km || 
|-id=172 bgcolor=#fefefe
| 190172 ||  || — || October 25, 2005 || Catalina || CSS || NYS || align=right | 2.0 km || 
|-id=173 bgcolor=#fefefe
| 190173 ||  || — || October 29, 2005 || Catalina || CSS || FLO || align=right | 1.0 km || 
|-id=174 bgcolor=#fefefe
| 190174 ||  || — || October 27, 2005 || Kitt Peak || Spacewatch || NYS || align=right | 1.1 km || 
|-id=175 bgcolor=#fefefe
| 190175 ||  || — || October 27, 2005 || Kitt Peak || Spacewatch || NYS || align=right | 1.1 km || 
|-id=176 bgcolor=#fefefe
| 190176 ||  || — || October 29, 2005 || Mount Lemmon || Mount Lemmon Survey || — || align=right data-sort-value="0.93" | 930 m || 
|-id=177 bgcolor=#fefefe
| 190177 ||  || — || October 28, 2005 || Catalina || CSS || — || align=right | 1.1 km || 
|-id=178 bgcolor=#fefefe
| 190178 ||  || — || October 31, 2005 || Mount Lemmon || Mount Lemmon Survey || V || align=right | 1.1 km || 
|-id=179 bgcolor=#fefefe
| 190179 ||  || — || October 31, 2005 || Mount Lemmon || Mount Lemmon Survey || — || align=right | 1.6 km || 
|-id=180 bgcolor=#fefefe
| 190180 ||  || — || October 27, 2005 || Anderson Mesa || LONEOS || FLO || align=right data-sort-value="0.70" | 700 m || 
|-id=181 bgcolor=#fefefe
| 190181 ||  || — || November 3, 2005 || Socorro || LINEAR || — || align=right | 2.3 km || 
|-id=182 bgcolor=#fefefe
| 190182 ||  || — || November 4, 2005 || Kitt Peak || Spacewatch || — || align=right | 1.2 km || 
|-id=183 bgcolor=#fefefe
| 190183 ||  || — || November 1, 2005 || Mount Lemmon || Mount Lemmon Survey || FLO || align=right data-sort-value="0.85" | 850 m || 
|-id=184 bgcolor=#fefefe
| 190184 ||  || — || November 6, 2005 || Kitt Peak || Spacewatch || — || align=right | 2.4 km || 
|-id=185 bgcolor=#fefefe
| 190185 ||  || — || November 21, 2005 || Kitt Peak || Spacewatch || — || align=right | 1.3 km || 
|-id=186 bgcolor=#fefefe
| 190186 ||  || — || November 21, 2005 || Kitt Peak || Spacewatch || NYS || align=right | 1.1 km || 
|-id=187 bgcolor=#E9E9E9
| 190187 ||  || — || November 25, 2005 || Mount Lemmon || Mount Lemmon Survey || — || align=right | 3.2 km || 
|-id=188 bgcolor=#fefefe
| 190188 ||  || — || November 25, 2005 || Catalina || CSS || — || align=right | 1.2 km || 
|-id=189 bgcolor=#fefefe
| 190189 ||  || — || November 25, 2005 || Kitt Peak || Spacewatch || — || align=right | 1.2 km || 
|-id=190 bgcolor=#E9E9E9
| 190190 ||  || — || November 28, 2005 || Mount Lemmon || Mount Lemmon Survey || — || align=right | 2.5 km || 
|-id=191 bgcolor=#fefefe
| 190191 ||  || — || November 26, 2005 || Catalina || CSS || — || align=right | 1.3 km || 
|-id=192 bgcolor=#fefefe
| 190192 ||  || — || November 25, 2005 || Catalina || CSS || — || align=right data-sort-value="0.94" | 940 m || 
|-id=193 bgcolor=#fefefe
| 190193 ||  || — || November 28, 2005 || Socorro || LINEAR || — || align=right | 1.1 km || 
|-id=194 bgcolor=#E9E9E9
| 190194 ||  || — || November 30, 2005 || Kitt Peak || Spacewatch || — || align=right | 4.0 km || 
|-id=195 bgcolor=#fefefe
| 190195 ||  || — || November 21, 2005 || Catalina || CSS || V || align=right data-sort-value="0.95" | 950 m || 
|-id=196 bgcolor=#fefefe
| 190196 ||  || — || December 4, 2005 || Kitt Peak || Spacewatch || NYS || align=right | 1.4 km || 
|-id=197 bgcolor=#E9E9E9
| 190197 ||  || — || December 7, 2005 || Socorro || LINEAR || — || align=right | 2.5 km || 
|-id=198 bgcolor=#E9E9E9
| 190198 ||  || — || December 9, 2005 || Socorro || LINEAR || — || align=right | 4.4 km || 
|-id=199 bgcolor=#E9E9E9
| 190199 ||  || — || December 25, 2005 || Kitt Peak || Spacewatch || — || align=right | 4.0 km || 
|-id=200 bgcolor=#E9E9E9
| 190200 ||  || — || December 27, 2005 || Mount Lemmon || Mount Lemmon Survey || — || align=right | 3.4 km || 
|}

190201–190300 

|-bgcolor=#d6d6d6
| 190201 ||  || — || December 29, 2005 || Socorro || LINEAR || — || align=right | 5.3 km || 
|-id=202 bgcolor=#E9E9E9
| 190202 ||  || — || December 25, 2005 || Anderson Mesa || LONEOS || — || align=right | 3.5 km || 
|-id=203 bgcolor=#E9E9E9
| 190203 ||  || — || December 27, 2005 || Kitt Peak || Spacewatch || — || align=right | 2.8 km || 
|-id=204 bgcolor=#fefefe
| 190204 ||  || — || December 28, 2005 || Palomar || NEAT || — || align=right | 1.4 km || 
|-id=205 bgcolor=#fefefe
| 190205 ||  || — || December 28, 2005 || Kitt Peak || Spacewatch || NYS || align=right | 2.6 km || 
|-id=206 bgcolor=#E9E9E9
| 190206 ||  || — || December 28, 2005 || Kitt Peak || Spacewatch || NEM || align=right | 3.4 km || 
|-id=207 bgcolor=#d6d6d6
| 190207 ||  || — || December 25, 2005 || Mount Lemmon || Mount Lemmon Survey || BRA || align=right | 2.7 km || 
|-id=208 bgcolor=#FFC2E0
| 190208 || 2006 AQ || — || January 2, 2006 || Mauna Kea || D. J. Tholen || AMO +1kmmoonslow || align=right data-sort-value="0.81" | 810 m || 
|-id=209 bgcolor=#d6d6d6
| 190209 ||  || — || January 5, 2006 || Catalina || CSS || — || align=right | 4.8 km || 
|-id=210 bgcolor=#d6d6d6
| 190210 ||  || — || January 9, 2006 || Kitt Peak || Spacewatch || — || align=right | 4.5 km || 
|-id=211 bgcolor=#d6d6d6
| 190211 ||  || — || January 22, 2006 || Mount Lemmon || Mount Lemmon Survey || EOS || align=right | 2.7 km || 
|-id=212 bgcolor=#d6d6d6
| 190212 ||  || — || January 23, 2006 || Mount Lemmon || Mount Lemmon Survey || — || align=right | 3.9 km || 
|-id=213 bgcolor=#d6d6d6
| 190213 ||  || — || January 23, 2006 || Kitt Peak || Spacewatch || 7:4 || align=right | 5.5 km || 
|-id=214 bgcolor=#d6d6d6
| 190214 ||  || — || January 25, 2006 || Kitt Peak || Spacewatch || LIX || align=right | 6.6 km || 
|-id=215 bgcolor=#E9E9E9
| 190215 ||  || — || January 26, 2006 || Mount Lemmon || Mount Lemmon Survey || — || align=right | 3.9 km || 
|-id=216 bgcolor=#d6d6d6
| 190216 ||  || — || January 25, 2006 || Kitt Peak || Spacewatch || — || align=right | 5.2 km || 
|-id=217 bgcolor=#d6d6d6
| 190217 ||  || — || January 31, 2006 || Kitt Peak || Spacewatch || — || align=right | 5.4 km || 
|-id=218 bgcolor=#d6d6d6
| 190218 ||  || — || January 30, 2006 || Kitt Peak || Spacewatch || KOR || align=right | 2.0 km || 
|-id=219 bgcolor=#d6d6d6
| 190219 ||  || — || February 4, 2006 || Kitt Peak || Spacewatch || — || align=right | 4.4 km || 
|-id=220 bgcolor=#d6d6d6
| 190220 ||  || — || February 4, 2006 || Catalina || CSS || — || align=right | 5.1 km || 
|-id=221 bgcolor=#d6d6d6
| 190221 ||  || — || February 21, 2006 || Mount Lemmon || Mount Lemmon Survey || THM || align=right | 3.7 km || 
|-id=222 bgcolor=#d6d6d6
| 190222 ||  || — || February 20, 2006 || Kitt Peak || Spacewatch || — || align=right | 3.4 km || 
|-id=223 bgcolor=#d6d6d6
| 190223 ||  || — || February 20, 2006 || Kitt Peak || Spacewatch || — || align=right | 4.7 km || 
|-id=224 bgcolor=#d6d6d6
| 190224 ||  || — || February 22, 2006 || Anderson Mesa || LONEOS || TEL || align=right | 3.1 km || 
|-id=225 bgcolor=#d6d6d6
| 190225 ||  || — || February 24, 2006 || Kitt Peak || Spacewatch || KOR || align=right | 2.3 km || 
|-id=226 bgcolor=#d6d6d6
| 190226 ||  || — || February 21, 2006 || Catalina || CSS || EOS || align=right | 3.4 km || 
|-id=227 bgcolor=#d6d6d6
| 190227 ||  || — || February 20, 2006 || Socorro || LINEAR || ALA || align=right | 7.7 km || 
|-id=228 bgcolor=#d6d6d6
| 190228 ||  || — || March 2, 2006 || Kitt Peak || Spacewatch || — || align=right | 4.0 km || 
|-id=229 bgcolor=#C2FFFF
| 190229 ||  || — || July 19, 2006 || Palomar || NEAT || L4 || align=right | 18 km || 
|-id=230 bgcolor=#d6d6d6
| 190230 ||  || — || October 15, 2006 || Kitt Peak || Spacewatch || — || align=right | 3.0 km || 
|-id=231 bgcolor=#E9E9E9
| 190231 ||  || — || October 19, 2006 || Kitt Peak || Spacewatch || — || align=right | 1.4 km || 
|-id=232 bgcolor=#fefefe
| 190232 ||  || — || November 11, 2006 || Kitt Peak || Spacewatch || V || align=right data-sort-value="0.86" | 860 m || 
|-id=233 bgcolor=#fefefe
| 190233 ||  || — || January 1, 2007 || Palomar || NEAT || H || align=right data-sort-value="0.83" | 830 m || 
|-id=234 bgcolor=#fefefe
| 190234 ||  || — || January 17, 2007 || Kitt Peak || Spacewatch || — || align=right | 1.3 km || 
|-id=235 bgcolor=#fefefe
| 190235 ||  || — || January 17, 2007 || Kitt Peak || Spacewatch || V || align=right data-sort-value="0.97" | 970 m || 
|-id=236 bgcolor=#d6d6d6
| 190236 ||  || — || January 27, 2007 || Kitt Peak || Spacewatch || — || align=right | 4.2 km || 
|-id=237 bgcolor=#E9E9E9
| 190237 ||  || — || February 17, 2007 || Kitt Peak || Spacewatch || — || align=right | 2.3 km || 
|-id=238 bgcolor=#fefefe
| 190238 ||  || — || February 17, 2007 || Catalina || CSS || — || align=right | 1.5 km || 
|-id=239 bgcolor=#d6d6d6
| 190239 ||  || — || February 17, 2007 || Catalina || CSS || — || align=right | 5.0 km || 
|-id=240 bgcolor=#E9E9E9
| 190240 ||  || — || February 19, 2007 || Mount Lemmon || Mount Lemmon Survey || KRM || align=right | 3.4 km || 
|-id=241 bgcolor=#fefefe
| 190241 ||  || — || February 21, 2007 || Mount Lemmon || Mount Lemmon Survey || — || align=right | 1.4 km || 
|-id=242 bgcolor=#fefefe
| 190242 ||  || — || February 21, 2007 || Kitt Peak || Spacewatch || V || align=right | 1.1 km || 
|-id=243 bgcolor=#d6d6d6
| 190243 ||  || — || March 11, 2007 || Anderson Mesa || LONEOS || — || align=right | 5.7 km || 
|-id=244 bgcolor=#fefefe
| 190244 ||  || — || March 10, 2007 || Kitt Peak || Spacewatch || — || align=right | 1.2 km || 
|-id=245 bgcolor=#d6d6d6
| 190245 ||  || — || March 10, 2007 || Kitt Peak || Spacewatch || THM || align=right | 3.2 km || 
|-id=246 bgcolor=#fefefe
| 190246 ||  || — || March 12, 2007 || Kitt Peak || Spacewatch || — || align=right | 1.4 km || 
|-id=247 bgcolor=#E9E9E9
| 190247 ||  || — || March 14, 2007 || Kitt Peak || Spacewatch || — || align=right | 2.4 km || 
|-id=248 bgcolor=#d6d6d6
| 190248 ||  || — || March 14, 2007 || Kitt Peak || Spacewatch || HYG || align=right | 4.5 km || 
|-id=249 bgcolor=#E9E9E9
| 190249 ||  || — || March 11, 2007 || Kitt Peak || Spacewatch || GEF || align=right | 1.8 km || 
|-id=250 bgcolor=#E9E9E9
| 190250 ||  || — || March 9, 2007 || Mount Lemmon || Mount Lemmon Survey || — || align=right | 2.7 km || 
|-id=251 bgcolor=#d6d6d6
| 190251 || 2007 GL || — || April 7, 2007 || Mount Lemmon || Mount Lemmon Survey || HYG || align=right | 3.8 km || 
|-id=252 bgcolor=#d6d6d6
| 190252 ||  || — || April 11, 2007 || Kitt Peak || Spacewatch || THM || align=right | 3.8 km || 
|-id=253 bgcolor=#E9E9E9
| 190253 ||  || — || April 11, 2007 || Siding Spring || SSS || INO || align=right | 2.3 km || 
|-id=254 bgcolor=#d6d6d6
| 190254 ||  || — || April 14, 2007 || Kitt Peak || Spacewatch || — || align=right | 2.9 km || 
|-id=255 bgcolor=#E9E9E9
| 190255 || 2007 HG || — || April 16, 2007 || 7300 Observatory || W. K. Y. Yeung || NEM || align=right | 3.8 km || 
|-id=256 bgcolor=#d6d6d6
| 190256 ||  || — || April 19, 2007 || Kitt Peak || Spacewatch || HYG || align=right | 3.8 km || 
|-id=257 bgcolor=#d6d6d6
| 190257 ||  || — || April 20, 2007 || Kitt Peak || Spacewatch || — || align=right | 6.4 km || 
|-id=258 bgcolor=#d6d6d6
| 190258 ||  || — || April 22, 2007 || Mount Lemmon || Mount Lemmon Survey || — || align=right | 3.9 km || 
|-id=259 bgcolor=#d6d6d6
| 190259 ||  || — || May 9, 2007 || Mount Lemmon || Mount Lemmon Survey || — || align=right | 5.1 km || 
|-id=260 bgcolor=#d6d6d6
| 190260 ||  || — || May 7, 2007 || Catalina || CSS || KOR || align=right | 2.5 km || 
|-id=261 bgcolor=#d6d6d6
| 190261 ||  || — || May 10, 2007 || Mount Lemmon || Mount Lemmon Survey || — || align=right | 4.3 km || 
|-id=262 bgcolor=#d6d6d6
| 190262 ||  || — || June 12, 2007 || Kitt Peak || Spacewatch || URS || align=right | 6.6 km || 
|-id=263 bgcolor=#d6d6d6
| 190263 ||  || — || June 16, 2007 || Kitt Peak || Spacewatch || EOS || align=right | 3.6 km || 
|-id=264 bgcolor=#C2FFFF
| 190264 ||  || — || July 7, 2007 || Marly || P. Kocher || L4 || align=right | 15 km || 
|-id=265 bgcolor=#E9E9E9
| 190265 ||  || — || October 8, 2007 || Socorro || LINEAR || HOF || align=right | 3.5 km || 
|-id=266 bgcolor=#E9E9E9
| 190266 ||  || — || October 19, 2007 || Mount Lemmon || Mount Lemmon Survey || — || align=right | 2.6 km || 
|-id=267 bgcolor=#C2FFFF
| 190267 ||  || — || November 3, 2007 || Mount Lemmon || Mount Lemmon Survey || L4 || align=right | 11 km || 
|-id=268 bgcolor=#C2FFFF
| 190268 ||  || — || December 5, 2007 || Catalina || CSS || L4 || align=right | 18 km || 
|-id=269 bgcolor=#E9E9E9
| 190269 ||  || — || March 9, 2008 || Mount Lemmon || Mount Lemmon Survey || PAD || align=right | 2.1 km || 
|-id=270 bgcolor=#E9E9E9
| 190270 ||  || — || March 30, 2008 || Kitt Peak || Spacewatch || — || align=right | 2.2 km || 
|-id=271 bgcolor=#d6d6d6
| 190271 ||  || — || April 24, 2008 || Kitt Peak || Spacewatch || — || align=right | 3.3 km || 
|-id=272 bgcolor=#E9E9E9
| 190272 ||  || — || July 9, 2008 || OAM || OAM Obs. || — || align=right | 3.7 km || 
|-id=273 bgcolor=#fefefe
| 190273 || 2822 P-L || — || September 24, 1960 || Palomar || PLS || — || align=right | 1.2 km || 
|-id=274 bgcolor=#FA8072
| 190274 || 3117 P-L || — || September 24, 1960 || Palomar || PLS || — || align=right data-sort-value="0.85" | 850 m || 
|-id=275 bgcolor=#E9E9E9
| 190275 || 4275 P-L || — || September 24, 1960 || Palomar || PLS || — || align=right | 1.6 km || 
|-id=276 bgcolor=#FA8072
| 190276 || 4548 P-L || — || September 24, 1960 || Palomar || PLS || — || align=right | 1.1 km || 
|-id=277 bgcolor=#E9E9E9
| 190277 || 6227 P-L || — || September 24, 1960 || Palomar || PLS || — || align=right | 1.8 km || 
|-id=278 bgcolor=#E9E9E9
| 190278 || 2217 T-2 || — || September 29, 1973 || Palomar || PLS || — || align=right | 1.9 km || 
|-id=279 bgcolor=#fefefe
| 190279 || 5143 T-2 || — || September 25, 1973 || Palomar || PLS || — || align=right data-sort-value="0.98" | 980 m || 
|-id=280 bgcolor=#fefefe
| 190280 || 2142 T-3 || — || October 16, 1977 || Palomar || PLS || — || align=right | 1.7 km || 
|-id=281 bgcolor=#d6d6d6
| 190281 || 3525 T-3 || — || October 16, 1977 || Palomar || PLS || — || align=right | 3.2 km || 
|-id=282 bgcolor=#fefefe
| 190282 ||  || — || October 26, 1989 || Palomar || E. F. Helin || — || align=right | 1.6 km || 
|-id=283 bgcolor=#fefefe
| 190283 Schielicke ||  ||  || September 12, 1991 || Tautenburg Observatory || F. Börngen, L. D. Schmadel || FLO || align=right | 1.1 km || 
|-id=284 bgcolor=#fefefe
| 190284 ||  || — || October 6, 1991 || Palomar || A. Lowe || NYS || align=right data-sort-value="0.78" | 780 m || 
|-id=285 bgcolor=#E9E9E9
| 190285 ||  || — || March 17, 1993 || La Silla || UESAC || — || align=right | 3.9 km || 
|-id=286 bgcolor=#E9E9E9
| 190286 ||  || — || March 17, 1993 || La Silla || UESAC || — || align=right | 2.0 km || 
|-id=287 bgcolor=#E9E9E9
| 190287 ||  || — || March 17, 1993 || La Silla || UESAC || WIT || align=right | 1.9 km || 
|-id=288 bgcolor=#fefefe
| 190288 ||  || — || August 10, 1994 || La Silla || E. W. Elst || FLO || align=right | 1.2 km || 
|-id=289 bgcolor=#E9E9E9
| 190289 ||  || — || August 10, 1994 || La Silla || E. W. Elst || DOR || align=right | 3.6 km || 
|-id=290 bgcolor=#E9E9E9
| 190290 || 1994 SZ || — || September 27, 1994 || Kitt Peak || Spacewatch || — || align=right | 3.8 km || 
|-id=291 bgcolor=#fefefe
| 190291 ||  || — || July 22, 1995 || Kitt Peak || Spacewatch || — || align=right data-sort-value="0.76" | 760 m || 
|-id=292 bgcolor=#E9E9E9
| 190292 ||  || — || July 24, 1995 || Kitt Peak || Spacewatch || IAN || align=right | 1.6 km || 
|-id=293 bgcolor=#E9E9E9
| 190293 ||  || — || July 22, 1995 || Kitt Peak || Spacewatch || EUN || align=right | 1.9 km || 
|-id=294 bgcolor=#C2FFFF
| 190294 ||  || — || August 22, 1995 || Kitt Peak || Spacewatch || L4 || align=right | 12 km || 
|-id=295 bgcolor=#fefefe
| 190295 ||  || — || September 19, 1995 || Kitt Peak || Spacewatch || FLO || align=right data-sort-value="0.89" | 890 m || 
|-id=296 bgcolor=#fefefe
| 190296 ||  || — || September 26, 1995 || Kitt Peak || Spacewatch || FLO || align=right data-sort-value="0.80" | 800 m || 
|-id=297 bgcolor=#E9E9E9
| 190297 ||  || — || October 24, 1995 || Kitt Peak || Spacewatch || MRX || align=right | 1.9 km || 
|-id=298 bgcolor=#fefefe
| 190298 ||  || — || November 20, 1995 || Kitt Peak || Spacewatch || FLO || align=right data-sort-value="0.74" | 740 m || 
|-id=299 bgcolor=#E9E9E9
| 190299 ||  || — || January 13, 1996 || Kiso || Kiso Obs. || GEF || align=right | 2.2 km || 
|-id=300 bgcolor=#E9E9E9
| 190300 || 1996 RV || — || September 10, 1996 || Haleakala || NEAT || — || align=right | 3.2 km || 
|}

190301–190400 

|-bgcolor=#C2FFFF
| 190301 ||  || — || September 8, 1996 || Kitt Peak || Spacewatch || L4 || align=right | 14 km || 
|-id=302 bgcolor=#E9E9E9
| 190302 ||  || — || December 7, 1996 || Kitt Peak || Spacewatch || — || align=right | 2.1 km || 
|-id=303 bgcolor=#E9E9E9
| 190303 ||  || — || January 9, 1997 || Kitt Peak || Spacewatch || — || align=right | 1.9 km || 
|-id=304 bgcolor=#E9E9E9
| 190304 ||  || — || March 2, 1997 || Kitt Peak || Spacewatch || AST || align=right | 3.7 km || 
|-id=305 bgcolor=#d6d6d6
| 190305 ||  || — || June 1, 1997 || Kitt Peak || Spacewatch || — || align=right | 3.4 km || 
|-id=306 bgcolor=#d6d6d6
| 190306 ||  || — || June 26, 1997 || Kitt Peak || Spacewatch || — || align=right | 4.0 km || 
|-id=307 bgcolor=#d6d6d6
| 190307 ||  || — || September 6, 1997 || Caussols || ODAS || HYG || align=right | 3.7 km || 
|-id=308 bgcolor=#d6d6d6
| 190308 ||  || — || September 23, 1997 || Kitt Peak || Spacewatch || THM || align=right | 2.9 km || 
|-id=309 bgcolor=#C2FFFF
| 190309 ||  || — || September 28, 1997 || Kitt Peak || Spacewatch || L4 || align=right | 14 km || 
|-id=310 bgcolor=#d6d6d6
| 190310 De Martin || 1997 TW ||  || October 2, 1997 || Sormano || V. Giuliani || — || align=right | 6.4 km || 
|-id=311 bgcolor=#C2FFFF
| 190311 ||  || — || October 3, 1997 || Caussols || ODAS || L4 || align=right | 14 km || 
|-id=312 bgcolor=#fefefe
| 190312 ||  || — || October 3, 1997 || Caussols || ODAS || CLA || align=right | 2.5 km || 
|-id=313 bgcolor=#fefefe
| 190313 ||  || — || October 23, 1997 || Kitt Peak || Spacewatch || MAS || align=right | 1.2 km || 
|-id=314 bgcolor=#d6d6d6
| 190314 ||  || — || November 1, 1997 || Ondřejov || P. Pravec, L. Kotková || — || align=right | 5.0 km || 
|-id=315 bgcolor=#fefefe
| 190315 ||  || — || November 5, 1997 || Nachi-Katsuura || Y. Shimizu, T. Urata || — || align=right | 3.8 km || 
|-id=316 bgcolor=#d6d6d6
| 190316 ||  || — || November 28, 1997 || Xinglong || SCAP || — || align=right | 6.0 km || 
|-id=317 bgcolor=#fefefe
| 190317 ||  || — || December 4, 1997 || La Silla || UDTS || — || align=right | 1.1 km || 
|-id=318 bgcolor=#E9E9E9
| 190318 ||  || — || February 22, 1998 || Kitt Peak || Spacewatch || — || align=right | 1.5 km || 
|-id=319 bgcolor=#E9E9E9
| 190319 ||  || — || March 20, 1998 || Socorro || LINEAR || — || align=right | 2.0 km || 
|-id=320 bgcolor=#E9E9E9
| 190320 ||  || — || April 20, 1998 || Socorro || LINEAR || CLO || align=right | 3.9 km || 
|-id=321 bgcolor=#E9E9E9
| 190321 ||  || — || April 24, 1998 || Kitt Peak || Spacewatch || — || align=right | 1.7 km || 
|-id=322 bgcolor=#E9E9E9
| 190322 ||  || — || April 21, 1998 || Socorro || LINEAR || — || align=right | 3.9 km || 
|-id=323 bgcolor=#E9E9E9
| 190323 ||  || — || May 19, 1998 || Kitt Peak || Spacewatch || DOR || align=right | 4.0 km || 
|-id=324 bgcolor=#fefefe
| 190324 ||  || — || July 26, 1998 || La Silla || E. W. Elst || — || align=right data-sort-value="0.89" | 890 m || 
|-id=325 bgcolor=#d6d6d6
| 190325 ||  || — || August 27, 1998 || Ondřejov || L. Kotková || — || align=right | 4.7 km || 
|-id=326 bgcolor=#fefefe
| 190326 ||  || — || August 24, 1998 || Socorro || LINEAR || — || align=right | 1.3 km || 
|-id=327 bgcolor=#FA8072
| 190327 ||  || — || August 24, 1998 || Socorro || LINEAR || — || align=right | 1.4 km || 
|-id=328 bgcolor=#fefefe
| 190328 ||  || — || September 13, 1998 || Kitt Peak || Spacewatch || — || align=right | 1.1 km || 
|-id=329 bgcolor=#d6d6d6
| 190329 ||  || — || September 14, 1998 || Kitt Peak || Spacewatch || KOR || align=right | 2.0 km || 
|-id=330 bgcolor=#fefefe
| 190330 ||  || — || September 14, 1998 || Socorro || LINEAR || — || align=right | 1.0 km || 
|-id=331 bgcolor=#fefefe
| 190331 ||  || — || September 14, 1998 || Socorro || LINEAR || — || align=right | 1.4 km || 
|-id=332 bgcolor=#fefefe
| 190332 ||  || — || September 14, 1998 || Socorro || LINEAR || — || align=right | 1.3 km || 
|-id=333 bgcolor=#d6d6d6
| 190333 Jirous ||  ||  || September 23, 1998 || Kleť || M. Tichý || — || align=right | 4.7 km || 
|-id=334 bgcolor=#fefefe
| 190334 ||  || — || September 17, 1998 || Anderson Mesa || LONEOS || — || align=right | 1.1 km || 
|-id=335 bgcolor=#d6d6d6
| 190335 ||  || — || September 19, 1998 || Socorro || LINEAR || — || align=right | 3.5 km || 
|-id=336 bgcolor=#fefefe
| 190336 ||  || — || September 26, 1998 || Socorro || LINEAR || — || align=right | 1.1 km || 
|-id=337 bgcolor=#d6d6d6
| 190337 ||  || — || September 26, 1998 || Socorro || LINEAR || — || align=right | 3.8 km || 
|-id=338 bgcolor=#fefefe
| 190338 ||  || — || September 26, 1998 || Socorro || LINEAR || — || align=right | 1.5 km || 
|-id=339 bgcolor=#FA8072
| 190339 ||  || — || September 26, 1998 || Socorro || LINEAR || — || align=right | 1.1 km || 
|-id=340 bgcolor=#fefefe
| 190340 ||  || — || September 18, 1998 || Anderson Mesa || LONEOS || FLO || align=right data-sort-value="0.87" | 870 m || 
|-id=341 bgcolor=#d6d6d6
| 190341 ||  || — || October 15, 1998 || Caussols || ODAS || — || align=right | 3.6 km || 
|-id=342 bgcolor=#fefefe
| 190342 ||  || — || October 13, 1998 || Kitt Peak || Spacewatch || — || align=right | 1.2 km || 
|-id=343 bgcolor=#d6d6d6
| 190343 ||  || — || October 14, 1998 || Kitt Peak || Spacewatch || EOS || align=right | 4.9 km || 
|-id=344 bgcolor=#d6d6d6
| 190344 ||  || — || October 15, 1998 || Kitt Peak || Spacewatch || EOS || align=right | 5.6 km || 
|-id=345 bgcolor=#fefefe
| 190345 ||  || — || October 23, 1998 || Kitt Peak || Spacewatch || FLO || align=right | 1.0 km || 
|-id=346 bgcolor=#FA8072
| 190346 ||  || — || October 28, 1998 || Socorro || LINEAR || — || align=right | 1.5 km || 
|-id=347 bgcolor=#d6d6d6
| 190347 ||  || — || November 10, 1998 || Socorro || LINEAR || EMA || align=right | 6.2 km || 
|-id=348 bgcolor=#d6d6d6
| 190348 ||  || — || November 10, 1998 || Socorro || LINEAR || — || align=right | 7.0 km || 
|-id=349 bgcolor=#fefefe
| 190349 ||  || — || November 23, 1998 || Socorro || LINEAR || PHO || align=right | 3.5 km || 
|-id=350 bgcolor=#E9E9E9
| 190350 ||  || — || November 18, 1998 || Kitt Peak || Spacewatch || — || align=right | 1.4 km || 
|-id=351 bgcolor=#C2FFFF
| 190351 ||  || — || December 7, 1998 || Caussols || ODAS || L4 || align=right | 11 km || 
|-id=352 bgcolor=#C2FFFF
| 190352 ||  || — || December 11, 1998 || Kitt Peak || Spacewatch || L4 || align=right | 15 km || 
|-id=353 bgcolor=#C2FFFF
| 190353 ||  || — || December 15, 1998 || Caussols || ODAS || L4 || align=right | 13 km || 
|-id=354 bgcolor=#d6d6d6
| 190354 ||  || — || December 25, 1998 || Kitt Peak || Spacewatch || THM || align=right | 3.3 km || 
|-id=355 bgcolor=#fefefe
| 190355 ||  || — || January 9, 1999 || Farra d'Isonzo || Farra d'Isonzo || — || align=right | 1.5 km || 
|-id=356 bgcolor=#fefefe
| 190356 ||  || — || January 18, 1999 || Kitt Peak || Spacewatch || — || align=right | 1.0 km || 
|-id=357 bgcolor=#d6d6d6
| 190357 ||  || — || February 12, 1999 || Socorro || LINEAR || EUP || align=right | 6.4 km || 
|-id=358 bgcolor=#d6d6d6
| 190358 ||  || — || February 9, 1999 || Kitt Peak || Spacewatch || VER || align=right | 4.4 km || 
|-id=359 bgcolor=#fefefe
| 190359 ||  || — || March 19, 1999 || Socorro || LINEAR || PHO || align=right | 2.0 km || 
|-id=360 bgcolor=#fefefe
| 190360 ||  || — || March 20, 1999 || Apache Point || SDSS || MAS || align=right | 2.3 km || 
|-id=361 bgcolor=#E9E9E9
| 190361 ||  || — || March 20, 1999 || Apache Point || SDSS || — || align=right | 1.4 km || 
|-id=362 bgcolor=#E9E9E9
| 190362 ||  || — || May 12, 1999 || Socorro || LINEAR || BRG || align=right | 3.2 km || 
|-id=363 bgcolor=#E9E9E9
| 190363 ||  || — || May 15, 1999 || Catalina || CSS || EUN || align=right | 1.9 km || 
|-id=364 bgcolor=#E9E9E9
| 190364 ||  || — || June 10, 1999 || Socorro || LINEAR || BAR || align=right | 2.4 km || 
|-id=365 bgcolor=#E9E9E9
| 190365 ||  || — || September 7, 1999 || Socorro || LINEAR || — || align=right | 4.0 km || 
|-id=366 bgcolor=#E9E9E9
| 190366 ||  || — || September 12, 1999 || Catalina || CSS || — || align=right | 3.6 km || 
|-id=367 bgcolor=#E9E9E9
| 190367 ||  || — || September 7, 1999 || Socorro || LINEAR || ADE || align=right | 3.8 km || 
|-id=368 bgcolor=#E9E9E9
| 190368 ||  || — || September 11, 1999 || Socorro || LINEAR || — || align=right | 2.8 km || 
|-id=369 bgcolor=#E9E9E9
| 190369 ||  || — || September 7, 1999 || Socorro || LINEAR || — || align=right | 3.6 km || 
|-id=370 bgcolor=#E9E9E9
| 190370 ||  || — || September 7, 1999 || Socorro || LINEAR || — || align=right | 5.1 km || 
|-id=371 bgcolor=#E9E9E9
| 190371 ||  || — || September 7, 1999 || Socorro || LINEAR || — || align=right | 3.9 km || 
|-id=372 bgcolor=#E9E9E9
| 190372 ||  || — || September 7, 1999 || Socorro || LINEAR || — || align=right | 3.5 km || 
|-id=373 bgcolor=#E9E9E9
| 190373 ||  || — || September 7, 1999 || Socorro || LINEAR || HNA || align=right | 4.0 km || 
|-id=374 bgcolor=#E9E9E9
| 190374 ||  || — || September 7, 1999 || Socorro || LINEAR || — || align=right | 4.1 km || 
|-id=375 bgcolor=#E9E9E9
| 190375 ||  || — || September 7, 1999 || Socorro || LINEAR || — || align=right | 3.6 km || 
|-id=376 bgcolor=#E9E9E9
| 190376 ||  || — || September 8, 1999 || Socorro || LINEAR || — || align=right | 4.5 km || 
|-id=377 bgcolor=#E9E9E9
| 190377 ||  || — || September 8, 1999 || Socorro || LINEAR || GEF || align=right | 1.9 km || 
|-id=378 bgcolor=#E9E9E9
| 190378 ||  || — || September 8, 1999 || Socorro || LINEAR || — || align=right | 3.9 km || 
|-id=379 bgcolor=#E9E9E9
| 190379 ||  || — || September 9, 1999 || Socorro || LINEAR || — || align=right | 5.4 km || 
|-id=380 bgcolor=#E9E9E9
| 190380 ||  || — || September 9, 1999 || Socorro || LINEAR || — || align=right | 3.5 km || 
|-id=381 bgcolor=#E9E9E9
| 190381 ||  || — || September 9, 1999 || Socorro || LINEAR || — || align=right | 4.2 km || 
|-id=382 bgcolor=#E9E9E9
| 190382 ||  || — || September 9, 1999 || Socorro || LINEAR || GEF || align=right | 2.2 km || 
|-id=383 bgcolor=#E9E9E9
| 190383 ||  || — || September 9, 1999 || Socorro || LINEAR || — || align=right | 3.4 km || 
|-id=384 bgcolor=#E9E9E9
| 190384 ||  || — || September 9, 1999 || Socorro || LINEAR || MRX || align=right | 1.5 km || 
|-id=385 bgcolor=#E9E9E9
| 190385 ||  || — || September 8, 1999 || Socorro || LINEAR || — || align=right | 3.7 km || 
|-id=386 bgcolor=#E9E9E9
| 190386 ||  || — || September 8, 1999 || Socorro || LINEAR || — || align=right | 4.1 km || 
|-id=387 bgcolor=#E9E9E9
| 190387 ||  || — || September 8, 1999 || Socorro || LINEAR || — || align=right | 4.1 km || 
|-id=388 bgcolor=#E9E9E9
| 190388 ||  || — || September 5, 1999 || Kitt Peak || Spacewatch || WIT || align=right | 1.8 km || 
|-id=389 bgcolor=#E9E9E9
| 190389 ||  || — || September 29, 1999 || Catalina || CSS || — || align=right | 4.3 km || 
|-id=390 bgcolor=#E9E9E9
| 190390 ||  || — || October 7, 1999 || Kitt Peak || Spacewatch || — || align=right | 3.3 km || 
|-id=391 bgcolor=#d6d6d6
| 190391 ||  || — || October 10, 1999 || Kitt Peak || Spacewatch || KOR || align=right | 2.0 km || 
|-id=392 bgcolor=#E9E9E9
| 190392 ||  || — || October 12, 1999 || Kitt Peak || Spacewatch || GEF || align=right | 1.9 km || 
|-id=393 bgcolor=#E9E9E9
| 190393 ||  || — || October 2, 1999 || Socorro || LINEAR || — || align=right | 5.1 km || 
|-id=394 bgcolor=#E9E9E9
| 190394 ||  || — || October 4, 1999 || Socorro || LINEAR || DOR || align=right | 4.4 km || 
|-id=395 bgcolor=#E9E9E9
| 190395 ||  || — || October 4, 1999 || Socorro || LINEAR || GEFslow || align=right | 2.4 km || 
|-id=396 bgcolor=#E9E9E9
| 190396 ||  || — || October 4, 1999 || Socorro || LINEAR || MRX || align=right | 1.9 km || 
|-id=397 bgcolor=#E9E9E9
| 190397 ||  || — || October 6, 1999 || Socorro || LINEAR || — || align=right | 3.2 km || 
|-id=398 bgcolor=#E9E9E9
| 190398 ||  || — || October 7, 1999 || Socorro || LINEAR || — || align=right | 3.1 km || 
|-id=399 bgcolor=#E9E9E9
| 190399 ||  || — || October 7, 1999 || Socorro || LINEAR || DOR || align=right | 5.5 km || 
|-id=400 bgcolor=#E9E9E9
| 190400 ||  || — || October 7, 1999 || Socorro || LINEAR || — || align=right | 4.1 km || 
|}

190401–190500 

|-bgcolor=#E9E9E9
| 190401 ||  || — || October 7, 1999 || Socorro || LINEAR || — || align=right | 3.7 km || 
|-id=402 bgcolor=#E9E9E9
| 190402 ||  || — || October 10, 1999 || Socorro || LINEAR || AGN || align=right | 1.9 km || 
|-id=403 bgcolor=#E9E9E9
| 190403 ||  || — || October 12, 1999 || Socorro || LINEAR || PAE || align=right | 5.2 km || 
|-id=404 bgcolor=#E9E9E9
| 190404 ||  || — || October 12, 1999 || Socorro || LINEAR || — || align=right | 4.8 km || 
|-id=405 bgcolor=#E9E9E9
| 190405 ||  || — || October 12, 1999 || Socorro || LINEAR || GEF || align=right | 2.4 km || 
|-id=406 bgcolor=#E9E9E9
| 190406 ||  || — || October 12, 1999 || Socorro || LINEAR || — || align=right | 4.7 km || 
|-id=407 bgcolor=#E9E9E9
| 190407 ||  || — || October 5, 1999 || Catalina || CSS || MRX || align=right | 1.9 km || 
|-id=408 bgcolor=#E9E9E9
| 190408 ||  || — || October 7, 1999 || Catalina || CSS || — || align=right | 4.2 km || 
|-id=409 bgcolor=#E9E9E9
| 190409 ||  || — || October 6, 1999 || Socorro || LINEAR || NEM || align=right | 3.3 km || 
|-id=410 bgcolor=#E9E9E9
| 190410 ||  || — || October 11, 1999 || Kitt Peak || Spacewatch || PAD || align=right | 2.6 km || 
|-id=411 bgcolor=#E9E9E9
| 190411 ||  || — || October 12, 1999 || Kitt Peak || Spacewatch || HOF || align=right | 3.0 km || 
|-id=412 bgcolor=#E9E9E9
| 190412 ||  || — || October 3, 1999 || Socorro || LINEAR || — || align=right | 4.9 km || 
|-id=413 bgcolor=#E9E9E9
| 190413 ||  || — || October 9, 1999 || Socorro || LINEAR || DOR || align=right | 4.2 km || 
|-id=414 bgcolor=#E9E9E9
| 190414 ||  || — || October 9, 1999 || Socorro || LINEAR || GEF || align=right | 1.6 km || 
|-id=415 bgcolor=#E9E9E9
| 190415 ||  || — || October 17, 1999 || Heppenheim || Starkenburg Obs. || — || align=right | 4.4 km || 
|-id=416 bgcolor=#E9E9E9
| 190416 ||  || — || October 29, 1999 || Catalina || CSS || — || align=right | 3.9 km || 
|-id=417 bgcolor=#E9E9E9
| 190417 ||  || — || October 29, 1999 || Catalina || CSS || — || align=right | 4.1 km || 
|-id=418 bgcolor=#E9E9E9
| 190418 ||  || — || October 31, 1999 || Catalina || CSS || — || align=right | 4.8 km || 
|-id=419 bgcolor=#E9E9E9
| 190419 ||  || — || November 4, 1999 || Socorro || LINEAR || HNA || align=right | 4.5 km || 
|-id=420 bgcolor=#E9E9E9
| 190420 ||  || — || November 4, 1999 || Socorro || LINEAR || — || align=right | 3.3 km || 
|-id=421 bgcolor=#E9E9E9
| 190421 ||  || — || November 4, 1999 || Socorro || LINEAR || GEF || align=right | 2.3 km || 
|-id=422 bgcolor=#E9E9E9
| 190422 ||  || — || November 9, 1999 || Socorro || LINEAR || — || align=right | 3.8 km || 
|-id=423 bgcolor=#d6d6d6
| 190423 ||  || — || November 9, 1999 || Socorro || LINEAR || KOR || align=right | 2.3 km || 
|-id=424 bgcolor=#E9E9E9
| 190424 ||  || — || November 9, 1999 || Catalina || CSS || — || align=right | 4.9 km || 
|-id=425 bgcolor=#d6d6d6
| 190425 ||  || — || November 12, 1999 || Socorro || LINEAR || KOR || align=right | 2.1 km || 
|-id=426 bgcolor=#fefefe
| 190426 ||  || — || November 9, 1999 || Kitt Peak || Spacewatch || — || align=right | 1.0 km || 
|-id=427 bgcolor=#E9E9E9
| 190427 ||  || — || November 14, 1999 || Socorro || LINEAR || HOF || align=right | 4.7 km || 
|-id=428 bgcolor=#E9E9E9
| 190428 ||  || — || November 14, 1999 || Socorro || LINEAR || DOR || align=right | 4.1 km || 
|-id=429 bgcolor=#E9E9E9
| 190429 ||  || — || November 6, 1999 || Socorro || LINEAR || — || align=right | 4.3 km || 
|-id=430 bgcolor=#E9E9E9
| 190430 ||  || — || November 15, 1999 || Socorro || LINEAR || — || align=right | 5.1 km || 
|-id=431 bgcolor=#E9E9E9
| 190431 ||  || — || November 3, 1999 || Socorro || LINEAR || EUN || align=right | 2.9 km || 
|-id=432 bgcolor=#E9E9E9
| 190432 ||  || — || November 30, 1999 || Kitt Peak || Spacewatch || NEM || align=right | 3.0 km || 
|-id=433 bgcolor=#d6d6d6
| 190433 ||  || — || December 7, 1999 || Socorro || LINEAR || — || align=right | 3.8 km || 
|-id=434 bgcolor=#E9E9E9
| 190434 ||  || — || December 7, 1999 || Socorro || LINEAR || GEF || align=right | 2.8 km || 
|-id=435 bgcolor=#d6d6d6
| 190435 ||  || — || December 7, 1999 || Kitt Peak || Spacewatch || — || align=right | 5.2 km || 
|-id=436 bgcolor=#E9E9E9
| 190436 ||  || — || December 12, 1999 || Socorro || LINEAR || — || align=right | 3.9 km || 
|-id=437 bgcolor=#d6d6d6
| 190437 ||  || — || December 12, 1999 || Socorro || LINEAR || BRA || align=right | 2.9 km || 
|-id=438 bgcolor=#E9E9E9
| 190438 ||  || — || December 12, 1999 || Socorro || LINEAR || DOR || align=right | 5.1 km || 
|-id=439 bgcolor=#d6d6d6
| 190439 ||  || — || December 12, 1999 || Socorro || LINEAR || — || align=right | 4.9 km || 
|-id=440 bgcolor=#d6d6d6
| 190440 ||  || — || December 13, 1999 || Kitt Peak || Spacewatch || KOR || align=right | 2.0 km || 
|-id=441 bgcolor=#E9E9E9
| 190441 ||  || — || December 12, 1999 || Socorro || LINEAR || PAE || align=right | 4.3 km || 
|-id=442 bgcolor=#C2FFFF
| 190442 ||  || — || December 13, 1999 || Kitt Peak || Spacewatch || L4 || align=right | 10 km || 
|-id=443 bgcolor=#fefefe
| 190443 ||  || — || December 5, 1999 || Kitt Peak || Spacewatch || — || align=right data-sort-value="0.80" | 800 m || 
|-id=444 bgcolor=#E9E9E9
| 190444 ||  || — || December 31, 1999 || Oizumi || T. Kobayashi || — || align=right | 4.2 km || 
|-id=445 bgcolor=#d6d6d6
| 190445 ||  || — || December 27, 1999 || Kitt Peak || Spacewatch || K-2 || align=right | 2.2 km || 
|-id=446 bgcolor=#C2FFFF
| 190446 ||  || — || January 2, 2000 || Socorro || LINEAR || L4 || align=right | 18 km || 
|-id=447 bgcolor=#d6d6d6
| 190447 ||  || — || January 3, 2000 || Socorro || LINEAR || — || align=right | 3.5 km || 
|-id=448 bgcolor=#fefefe
| 190448 ||  || — || January 3, 2000 || Socorro || LINEAR || — || align=right | 3.0 km || 
|-id=449 bgcolor=#E9E9E9
| 190449 ||  || — || January 4, 2000 || Socorro || LINEAR || — || align=right | 5.3 km || 
|-id=450 bgcolor=#E9E9E9
| 190450 ||  || — || January 5, 2000 || Socorro || LINEAR || — || align=right | 4.5 km || 
|-id=451 bgcolor=#FA8072
| 190451 ||  || — || January 7, 2000 || Socorro || LINEAR || — || align=right | 1.5 km || 
|-id=452 bgcolor=#d6d6d6
| 190452 ||  || — || January 5, 2000 || Kitt Peak || Spacewatch || — || align=right | 4.2 km || 
|-id=453 bgcolor=#d6d6d6
| 190453 ||  || — || January 5, 2000 || Socorro || LINEAR || — || align=right | 3.6 km || 
|-id=454 bgcolor=#d6d6d6
| 190454 ||  || — || January 28, 2000 || Kitt Peak || Spacewatch || THM || align=right | 3.2 km || 
|-id=455 bgcolor=#d6d6d6
| 190455 ||  || — || January 29, 2000 || Kitt Peak || Spacewatch || — || align=right | 4.7 km || 
|-id=456 bgcolor=#d6d6d6
| 190456 ||  || — || January 30, 2000 || Catalina || CSS || — || align=right | 3.2 km || 
|-id=457 bgcolor=#d6d6d6
| 190457 ||  || — || January 28, 2000 || Kitt Peak || Spacewatch || EOS || align=right | 3.2 km || 
|-id=458 bgcolor=#C2FFFF
| 190458 ||  || — || January 29, 2000 || Kitt Peak || Spacewatch || L4 || align=right | 16 km || 
|-id=459 bgcolor=#d6d6d6
| 190459 ||  || — || February 2, 2000 || Socorro || LINEAR || EOS || align=right | 4.3 km || 
|-id=460 bgcolor=#d6d6d6
| 190460 ||  || — || February 2, 2000 || Socorro || LINEAR || EOS || align=right | 4.4 km || 
|-id=461 bgcolor=#fefefe
| 190461 ||  || — || February 3, 2000 || Višnjan Observatory || K. Korlević || FLO || align=right | 1.4 km || 
|-id=462 bgcolor=#fefefe
| 190462 ||  || — || February 2, 2000 || Socorro || LINEAR || — || align=right | 1.2 km || 
|-id=463 bgcolor=#d6d6d6
| 190463 ||  || — || February 5, 2000 || Socorro || LINEAR || ITH || align=right | 2.3 km || 
|-id=464 bgcolor=#d6d6d6
| 190464 ||  || — || February 2, 2000 || Socorro || LINEAR || — || align=right | 3.2 km || 
|-id=465 bgcolor=#fefefe
| 190465 ||  || — || February 8, 2000 || Kitt Peak || Spacewatch || — || align=right | 1.1 km || 
|-id=466 bgcolor=#d6d6d6
| 190466 ||  || — || February 2, 2000 || Socorro || LINEAR || — || align=right | 5.7 km || 
|-id=467 bgcolor=#d6d6d6
| 190467 ||  || — || February 6, 2000 || Catalina || CSS || — || align=right | 5.2 km || 
|-id=468 bgcolor=#fefefe
| 190468 ||  || — || February 5, 2000 || Kitt Peak || Spacewatch || V || align=right data-sort-value="0.92" | 920 m || 
|-id=469 bgcolor=#d6d6d6
| 190469 ||  || — || February 26, 2000 || Kitt Peak || Spacewatch || — || align=right | 4.6 km || 
|-id=470 bgcolor=#d6d6d6
| 190470 ||  || — || February 26, 2000 || Kitt Peak || Spacewatch || — || align=right | 3.0 km || 
|-id=471 bgcolor=#d6d6d6
| 190471 ||  || — || February 29, 2000 || Socorro || LINEAR || — || align=right | 6.7 km || 
|-id=472 bgcolor=#d6d6d6
| 190472 ||  || — || February 29, 2000 || Socorro || LINEAR || — || align=right | 7.4 km || 
|-id=473 bgcolor=#fefefe
| 190473 ||  || — || February 29, 2000 || Socorro || LINEAR || — || align=right | 1.1 km || 
|-id=474 bgcolor=#d6d6d6
| 190474 ||  || — || February 29, 2000 || Socorro || LINEAR || EOS || align=right | 5.4 km || 
|-id=475 bgcolor=#fefefe
| 190475 ||  || — || February 29, 2000 || Socorro || LINEAR || — || align=right data-sort-value="0.94" | 940 m || 
|-id=476 bgcolor=#d6d6d6
| 190476 ||  || — || February 29, 2000 || Socorro || LINEAR || — || align=right | 3.3 km || 
|-id=477 bgcolor=#fefefe
| 190477 ||  || — || February 25, 2000 || Kitt Peak || Spacewatch || — || align=right | 1.4 km || 
|-id=478 bgcolor=#d6d6d6
| 190478 ||  || — || February 29, 2000 || Socorro || LINEAR || — || align=right | 4.9 km || 
|-id=479 bgcolor=#d6d6d6
| 190479 ||  || — || February 29, 2000 || Socorro || LINEAR || ALA || align=right | 6.3 km || 
|-id=480 bgcolor=#d6d6d6
| 190480 ||  || — || February 29, 2000 || Socorro || LINEAR || — || align=right | 3.5 km || 
|-id=481 bgcolor=#d6d6d6
| 190481 ||  || — || February 29, 2000 || Socorro || LINEAR || — || align=right | 2.9 km || 
|-id=482 bgcolor=#d6d6d6
| 190482 ||  || — || February 27, 2000 || Kitt Peak || Spacewatch || — || align=right | 5.6 km || 
|-id=483 bgcolor=#fefefe
| 190483 ||  || — || March 3, 2000 || Socorro || LINEAR || — || align=right | 1.6 km || 
|-id=484 bgcolor=#fefefe
| 190484 ||  || — || March 3, 2000 || Socorro || LINEAR || FLO || align=right data-sort-value="0.92" | 920 m || 
|-id=485 bgcolor=#fefefe
| 190485 ||  || — || March 3, 2000 || Socorro || LINEAR || V || align=right data-sort-value="0.91" | 910 m || 
|-id=486 bgcolor=#d6d6d6
| 190486 ||  || — || March 3, 2000 || Socorro || LINEAR || — || align=right | 5.0 km || 
|-id=487 bgcolor=#fefefe
| 190487 ||  || — || March 3, 2000 || Socorro || LINEAR || — || align=right | 1.2 km || 
|-id=488 bgcolor=#fefefe
| 190488 ||  || — || March 8, 2000 || Socorro || LINEAR || — || align=right | 1.7 km || 
|-id=489 bgcolor=#d6d6d6
| 190489 ||  || — || March 10, 2000 || Socorro || LINEAR || — || align=right | 6.7 km || 
|-id=490 bgcolor=#fefefe
| 190490 ||  || — || March 1, 2000 || Kitt Peak || Spacewatch || — || align=right | 1.5 km || 
|-id=491 bgcolor=#FFC2E0
| 190491 ||  || — || March 25, 2000 || Kitt Peak || Spacewatch || APO || align=right data-sort-value="0.23" | 230 m || 
|-id=492 bgcolor=#d6d6d6
| 190492 ||  || — || March 29, 2000 || Socorro || LINEAR || — || align=right | 3.3 km || 
|-id=493 bgcolor=#fefefe
| 190493 ||  || — || April 5, 2000 || Socorro || LINEAR || — || align=right | 1.1 km || 
|-id=494 bgcolor=#fefefe
| 190494 ||  || — || April 5, 2000 || Socorro || LINEAR || — || align=right | 1.2 km || 
|-id=495 bgcolor=#fefefe
| 190495 ||  || — || April 5, 2000 || Socorro || LINEAR || — || align=right | 1.7 km || 
|-id=496 bgcolor=#fefefe
| 190496 ||  || — || April 5, 2000 || Socorro || LINEAR || — || align=right | 1.4 km || 
|-id=497 bgcolor=#fefefe
| 190497 ||  || — || April 7, 2000 || Socorro || LINEAR || ERI || align=right | 2.7 km || 
|-id=498 bgcolor=#fefefe
| 190498 ||  || — || April 2, 2000 || Anderson Mesa || LONEOS || — || align=right | 1.6 km || 
|-id=499 bgcolor=#fefefe
| 190499 ||  || — || April 3, 2000 || Anderson Mesa || LONEOS || — || align=right | 1.1 km || 
|-id=500 bgcolor=#d6d6d6
| 190500 ||  || — || April 3, 2000 || Anderson Mesa || LONEOS || LIX || align=right | 6.0 km || 
|}

190501–190600 

|-bgcolor=#fefefe
| 190501 ||  || — || April 12, 2000 || Kitt Peak || Spacewatch || MAS || align=right data-sort-value="0.82" | 820 m || 
|-id=502 bgcolor=#fefefe
| 190502 ||  || — || April 5, 2000 || Anderson Mesa || LONEOS || NYS || align=right data-sort-value="0.94" | 940 m || 
|-id=503 bgcolor=#fefefe
| 190503 ||  || — || April 3, 2000 || Kitt Peak || Spacewatch || NYS || align=right data-sort-value="0.89" | 890 m || 
|-id=504 bgcolor=#fefefe
| 190504 Hermanottó || 2000 HE ||  || April 22, 2000 || Piszkéstető || K. Sárneczky, G. Szabó || NYS || align=right data-sort-value="0.85" | 850 m || 
|-id=505 bgcolor=#fefefe
| 190505 ||  || — || April 27, 2000 || Kitt Peak || Spacewatch || FLO || align=right data-sort-value="0.97" | 970 m || 
|-id=506 bgcolor=#fefefe
| 190506 ||  || — || April 25, 2000 || Kitt Peak || Spacewatch || FLO || align=right | 1.1 km || 
|-id=507 bgcolor=#fefefe
| 190507 ||  || — || April 24, 2000 || Anderson Mesa || LONEOS || NYS || align=right | 1.2 km || 
|-id=508 bgcolor=#fefefe
| 190508 ||  || — || April 29, 2000 || Kitt Peak || Spacewatch || — || align=right | 1.2 km || 
|-id=509 bgcolor=#fefefe
| 190509 ||  || — || April 29, 2000 || Socorro || LINEAR || fast? || align=right | 1.2 km || 
|-id=510 bgcolor=#fefefe
| 190510 ||  || — || April 25, 2000 || Anderson Mesa || LONEOS || NYS || align=right | 1.1 km || 
|-id=511 bgcolor=#fefefe
| 190511 ||  || — || April 25, 2000 || Anderson Mesa || LONEOS || NYS || align=right | 1.1 km || 
|-id=512 bgcolor=#fefefe
| 190512 ||  || — || May 6, 2000 || Socorro || LINEAR || — || align=right | 2.8 km || 
|-id=513 bgcolor=#fefefe
| 190513 ||  || — || May 7, 2000 || Socorro || LINEAR || V || align=right data-sort-value="0.99" | 990 m || 
|-id=514 bgcolor=#fefefe
| 190514 ||  || — || May 7, 2000 || Socorro || LINEAR || NYS || align=right data-sort-value="0.88" | 880 m || 
|-id=515 bgcolor=#fefefe
| 190515 ||  || — || May 9, 2000 || Socorro || LINEAR || NYS || align=right data-sort-value="0.93" | 930 m || 
|-id=516 bgcolor=#fefefe
| 190516 ||  || — || May 2, 2000 || Anderson Mesa || LONEOS || — || align=right | 4.2 km || 
|-id=517 bgcolor=#fefefe
| 190517 ||  || — || May 27, 2000 || Socorro || LINEAR || — || align=right | 1.2 km || 
|-id=518 bgcolor=#fefefe
| 190518 ||  || — || May 26, 2000 || Kitt Peak || Spacewatch || MAS || align=right | 1.1 km || 
|-id=519 bgcolor=#E9E9E9
| 190519 ||  || — || July 5, 2000 || Anderson Mesa || LONEOS || — || align=right | 1.4 km || 
|-id=520 bgcolor=#E9E9E9
| 190520 ||  || — || August 5, 2000 || Haleakala || NEAT || MIT || align=right | 6.0 km || 
|-id=521 bgcolor=#E9E9E9
| 190521 ||  || — || August 24, 2000 || Socorro || LINEAR || — || align=right | 1.3 km || 
|-id=522 bgcolor=#E9E9E9
| 190522 ||  || — || August 24, 2000 || Socorro || LINEAR || — || align=right | 1.6 km || 
|-id=523 bgcolor=#E9E9E9
| 190523 ||  || — || August 25, 2000 || Socorro || LINEAR || — || align=right | 2.7 km || 
|-id=524 bgcolor=#E9E9E9
| 190524 ||  || — || August 29, 2000 || Socorro || LINEAR || — || align=right | 1.6 km || 
|-id=525 bgcolor=#fefefe
| 190525 ||  || — || August 29, 2000 || Socorro || LINEAR || NYS || align=right | 1.6 km || 
|-id=526 bgcolor=#E9E9E9
| 190526 ||  || — || August 31, 2000 || Socorro || LINEAR || — || align=right | 1.4 km || 
|-id=527 bgcolor=#E9E9E9
| 190527 ||  || — || August 29, 2000 || Socorro || LINEAR || — || align=right | 1.6 km || 
|-id=528 bgcolor=#E9E9E9
| 190528 ||  || — || August 31, 2000 || Socorro || LINEAR || — || align=right | 2.6 km || 
|-id=529 bgcolor=#E9E9E9
| 190529 ||  || — || August 26, 2000 || Socorro || LINEAR || — || align=right | 1.8 km || 
|-id=530 bgcolor=#fefefe
| 190530 ||  || — || August 26, 2000 || Socorro || LINEAR || — || align=right | 1.6 km || 
|-id=531 bgcolor=#fefefe
| 190531 ||  || — || August 31, 2000 || Socorro || LINEAR || — || align=right | 1.5 km || 
|-id=532 bgcolor=#E9E9E9
| 190532 ||  || — || August 31, 2000 || Socorro || LINEAR || — || align=right | 1.5 km || 
|-id=533 bgcolor=#E9E9E9
| 190533 ||  || — || September 1, 2000 || Socorro || LINEAR || RAF || align=right | 1.8 km || 
|-id=534 bgcolor=#fefefe
| 190534 ||  || — || September 1, 2000 || Socorro || LINEAR || H || align=right data-sort-value="0.94" | 940 m || 
|-id=535 bgcolor=#E9E9E9
| 190535 ||  || — || September 1, 2000 || Socorro || LINEAR || — || align=right | 1.6 km || 
|-id=536 bgcolor=#fefefe
| 190536 ||  || — || September 2, 2000 || Socorro || LINEAR || H || align=right data-sort-value="0.92" | 920 m || 
|-id=537 bgcolor=#E9E9E9
| 190537 ||  || — || September 3, 2000 || Socorro || LINEAR || — || align=right | 1.9 km || 
|-id=538 bgcolor=#fefefe
| 190538 ||  || — || September 3, 2000 || Socorro || LINEAR || H || align=right | 1.2 km || 
|-id=539 bgcolor=#E9E9E9
| 190539 ||  || — || September 6, 2000 || Socorro || LINEAR || — || align=right | 1.9 km || 
|-id=540 bgcolor=#E9E9E9
| 190540 ||  || — || September 1, 2000 || Socorro || LINEAR || — || align=right | 1.8 km || 
|-id=541 bgcolor=#FA8072
| 190541 ||  || — || September 8, 2000 || Socorro || LINEAR || H || align=right | 1.8 km || 
|-id=542 bgcolor=#E9E9E9
| 190542 ||  || — || September 8, 2000 || Kitt Peak || Spacewatch || — || align=right | 1.1 km || 
|-id=543 bgcolor=#FA8072
| 190543 ||  || — || September 1, 2000 || Socorro || LINEAR || — || align=right | 1.0 km || 
|-id=544 bgcolor=#E9E9E9
| 190544 ||  || — || September 2, 2000 || Anderson Mesa || LONEOS || — || align=right | 1.3 km || 
|-id=545 bgcolor=#E9E9E9
| 190545 ||  || — || September 3, 2000 || Socorro || LINEAR || — || align=right | 1.6 km || 
|-id=546 bgcolor=#E9E9E9
| 190546 ||  || — || September 23, 2000 || Socorro || LINEAR || — || align=right | 2.8 km || 
|-id=547 bgcolor=#E9E9E9
| 190547 ||  || — || September 23, 2000 || Socorro || LINEAR || — || align=right | 1.8 km || 
|-id=548 bgcolor=#E9E9E9
| 190548 ||  || — || September 23, 2000 || Socorro || LINEAR || — || align=right | 2.0 km || 
|-id=549 bgcolor=#fefefe
| 190549 ||  || — || September 24, 2000 || Socorro || LINEAR || — || align=right | 2.2 km || 
|-id=550 bgcolor=#fefefe
| 190550 ||  || — || September 24, 2000 || Socorro || LINEAR || H || align=right | 1.0 km || 
|-id=551 bgcolor=#E9E9E9
| 190551 ||  || — || September 23, 2000 || Socorro || LINEAR || — || align=right | 1.6 km || 
|-id=552 bgcolor=#E9E9E9
| 190552 ||  || — || September 23, 2000 || Socorro || LINEAR || — || align=right | 1.8 km || 
|-id=553 bgcolor=#E9E9E9
| 190553 ||  || — || September 24, 2000 || Socorro || LINEAR || — || align=right | 1.7 km || 
|-id=554 bgcolor=#E9E9E9
| 190554 ||  || — || September 24, 2000 || Socorro || LINEAR || — || align=right | 1.3 km || 
|-id=555 bgcolor=#E9E9E9
| 190555 ||  || — || September 24, 2000 || Socorro || LINEAR || — || align=right | 1.7 km || 
|-id=556 bgcolor=#fefefe
| 190556 ||  || — || September 24, 2000 || Socorro || LINEAR || — || align=right | 1.6 km || 
|-id=557 bgcolor=#E9E9E9
| 190557 ||  || — || September 24, 2000 || Socorro || LINEAR || — || align=right | 1.4 km || 
|-id=558 bgcolor=#E9E9E9
| 190558 ||  || — || September 24, 2000 || Socorro || LINEAR || — || align=right | 1.2 km || 
|-id=559 bgcolor=#fefefe
| 190559 ||  || — || September 24, 2000 || Socorro || LINEAR || — || align=right | 1.8 km || 
|-id=560 bgcolor=#E9E9E9
| 190560 ||  || — || September 24, 2000 || Socorro || LINEAR || EUN || align=right | 2.0 km || 
|-id=561 bgcolor=#E9E9E9
| 190561 ||  || — || September 23, 2000 || Socorro || LINEAR || EUN || align=right | 1.9 km || 
|-id=562 bgcolor=#E9E9E9
| 190562 ||  || — || September 24, 2000 || Socorro || LINEAR || — || align=right | 1.2 km || 
|-id=563 bgcolor=#E9E9E9
| 190563 ||  || — || September 24, 2000 || Socorro || LINEAR || — || align=right | 1.9 km || 
|-id=564 bgcolor=#E9E9E9
| 190564 ||  || — || September 24, 2000 || Socorro || LINEAR || — || align=right | 2.2 km || 
|-id=565 bgcolor=#E9E9E9
| 190565 ||  || — || September 22, 2000 || Socorro || LINEAR || BRU || align=right | 4.9 km || 
|-id=566 bgcolor=#E9E9E9
| 190566 ||  || — || September 22, 2000 || Socorro || LINEAR || — || align=right | 3.8 km || 
|-id=567 bgcolor=#E9E9E9
| 190567 ||  || — || September 23, 2000 || Socorro || LINEAR || — || align=right | 1.4 km || 
|-id=568 bgcolor=#E9E9E9
| 190568 ||  || — || September 20, 2000 || Haleakala || NEAT || — || align=right | 1.1 km || 
|-id=569 bgcolor=#E9E9E9
| 190569 ||  || — || September 23, 2000 || Socorro || LINEAR || — || align=right | 1.6 km || 
|-id=570 bgcolor=#E9E9E9
| 190570 ||  || — || September 24, 2000 || Socorro || LINEAR || — || align=right | 1.3 km || 
|-id=571 bgcolor=#E9E9E9
| 190571 ||  || — || September 24, 2000 || Socorro || LINEAR || — || align=right | 1.2 km || 
|-id=572 bgcolor=#E9E9E9
| 190572 ||  || — || September 25, 2000 || Socorro || LINEAR || — || align=right | 2.0 km || 
|-id=573 bgcolor=#E9E9E9
| 190573 ||  || — || September 25, 2000 || Socorro || LINEAR || — || align=right | 1.9 km || 
|-id=574 bgcolor=#E9E9E9
| 190574 ||  || — || September 27, 2000 || Socorro || LINEAR || EUN || align=right | 1.9 km || 
|-id=575 bgcolor=#fefefe
| 190575 ||  || — || September 24, 2000 || Socorro || LINEAR || NYS || align=right | 1.0 km || 
|-id=576 bgcolor=#E9E9E9
| 190576 ||  || — || September 27, 2000 || Socorro || LINEAR || — || align=right | 1.3 km || 
|-id=577 bgcolor=#E9E9E9
| 190577 ||  || — || September 28, 2000 || Socorro || LINEAR || — || align=right | 2.1 km || 
|-id=578 bgcolor=#fefefe
| 190578 ||  || — || September 28, 2000 || Socorro || LINEAR || — || align=right | 1.4 km || 
|-id=579 bgcolor=#E9E9E9
| 190579 ||  || — || September 26, 2000 || Socorro || LINEAR || — || align=right | 4.2 km || 
|-id=580 bgcolor=#E9E9E9
| 190580 ||  || — || September 27, 2000 || Socorro || LINEAR || — || align=right | 2.7 km || 
|-id=581 bgcolor=#E9E9E9
| 190581 ||  || — || September 27, 2000 || Socorro || LINEAR || — || align=right | 3.7 km || 
|-id=582 bgcolor=#E9E9E9
| 190582 ||  || — || September 28, 2000 || Socorro || LINEAR || — || align=right | 1.2 km || 
|-id=583 bgcolor=#E9E9E9
| 190583 ||  || — || September 30, 2000 || Socorro || LINEAR || — || align=right | 1.7 km || 
|-id=584 bgcolor=#E9E9E9
| 190584 ||  || — || September 26, 2000 || Socorro || LINEAR || — || align=right | 4.7 km || 
|-id=585 bgcolor=#E9E9E9
| 190585 ||  || — || September 25, 2000 || Socorro || LINEAR || — || align=right | 3.5 km || 
|-id=586 bgcolor=#E9E9E9
| 190586 ||  || — || September 29, 2000 || Anderson Mesa || LONEOS || — || align=right | 3.3 km || 
|-id=587 bgcolor=#E9E9E9
| 190587 ||  || — || September 23, 2000 || Anderson Mesa || LONEOS || — || align=right | 1.5 km || 
|-id=588 bgcolor=#d6d6d6
| 190588 ||  || — || September 22, 2000 || Anderson Mesa || LONEOS || LIX || align=right | 6.3 km || 
|-id=589 bgcolor=#E9E9E9
| 190589 ||  || — || October 1, 2000 || Socorro || LINEAR || — || align=right | 1.5 km || 
|-id=590 bgcolor=#E9E9E9
| 190590 ||  || — || October 1, 2000 || Socorro || LINEAR || — || align=right | 1.3 km || 
|-id=591 bgcolor=#E9E9E9
| 190591 ||  || — || October 1, 2000 || Socorro || LINEAR || — || align=right | 1.2 km || 
|-id=592 bgcolor=#E9E9E9
| 190592 ||  || — || October 6, 2000 || Anderson Mesa || LONEOS || — || align=right data-sort-value="0.98" | 980 m || 
|-id=593 bgcolor=#E9E9E9
| 190593 ||  || — || October 1, 2000 || Socorro || LINEAR || HNA || align=right | 3.5 km || 
|-id=594 bgcolor=#E9E9E9
| 190594 ||  || — || October 2, 2000 || Anderson Mesa || LONEOS || — || align=right | 2.4 km || 
|-id=595 bgcolor=#fefefe
| 190595 ||  || — || October 2, 2000 || Socorro || LINEAR || — || align=right | 1.5 km || 
|-id=596 bgcolor=#E9E9E9
| 190596 ||  || — || October 23, 2000 || Desert Beaver || W. K. Y. Yeung || JUN || align=right | 1.7 km || 
|-id=597 bgcolor=#E9E9E9
| 190597 ||  || — || October 24, 2000 || Socorro || LINEAR || — || align=right | 2.0 km || 
|-id=598 bgcolor=#E9E9E9
| 190598 ||  || — || October 24, 2000 || Socorro || LINEAR || ADE || align=right | 4.1 km || 
|-id=599 bgcolor=#E9E9E9
| 190599 ||  || — || October 24, 2000 || Socorro || LINEAR || RAF || align=right | 2.1 km || 
|-id=600 bgcolor=#E9E9E9
| 190600 ||  || — || October 25, 2000 || Socorro || LINEAR || — || align=right | 1.8 km || 
|}

190601–190700 

|-bgcolor=#E9E9E9
| 190601 ||  || — || October 31, 2000 || Socorro || LINEAR || — || align=right | 1.6 km || 
|-id=602 bgcolor=#E9E9E9
| 190602 ||  || — || October 24, 2000 || Socorro || LINEAR || BAR || align=right | 2.3 km || 
|-id=603 bgcolor=#E9E9E9
| 190603 ||  || — || October 24, 2000 || Socorro || LINEAR || 524 || align=right | 1.8 km || 
|-id=604 bgcolor=#E9E9E9
| 190604 ||  || — || October 31, 2000 || Socorro || LINEAR || — || align=right | 2.7 km || 
|-id=605 bgcolor=#E9E9E9
| 190605 ||  || — || October 25, 2000 || Socorro || LINEAR || — || align=right | 1.4 km || 
|-id=606 bgcolor=#E9E9E9
| 190606 ||  || — || October 25, 2000 || Socorro || LINEAR || — || align=right | 2.1 km || 
|-id=607 bgcolor=#E9E9E9
| 190607 ||  || — || October 31, 2000 || Socorro || LINEAR || — || align=right | 2.6 km || 
|-id=608 bgcolor=#E9E9E9
| 190608 ||  || — || November 1, 2000 || Socorro || LINEAR || — || align=right | 2.5 km || 
|-id=609 bgcolor=#E9E9E9
| 190609 ||  || — || November 1, 2000 || Socorro || LINEAR || — || align=right | 2.0 km || 
|-id=610 bgcolor=#E9E9E9
| 190610 ||  || — || November 1, 2000 || Socorro || LINEAR || — || align=right | 2.4 km || 
|-id=611 bgcolor=#E9E9E9
| 190611 ||  || — || November 1, 2000 || Kitt Peak || Spacewatch || — || align=right | 1.1 km || 
|-id=612 bgcolor=#E9E9E9
| 190612 ||  || — || November 3, 2000 || Socorro || LINEAR || — || align=right | 1.8 km || 
|-id=613 bgcolor=#E9E9E9
| 190613 ||  || — || November 2, 2000 || Socorro || LINEAR || — || align=right | 3.2 km || 
|-id=614 bgcolor=#E9E9E9
| 190614 ||  || — || November 3, 2000 || Socorro || LINEAR || — || align=right | 2.2 km || 
|-id=615 bgcolor=#E9E9E9
| 190615 ||  || — || November 6, 2000 || Socorro || LINEAR || — || align=right | 2.7 km || 
|-id=616 bgcolor=#E9E9E9
| 190616 ||  || — || November 19, 2000 || Socorro || LINEAR || MIT || align=right | 4.3 km || 
|-id=617 bgcolor=#E9E9E9
| 190617 Alexandergerst ||  ||  || November 19, 2000 || Drebach || J. Kandler || — || align=right | 1.5 km || 
|-id=618 bgcolor=#E9E9E9
| 190618 ||  || — || November 21, 2000 || Socorro || LINEAR || MIS || align=right | 3.2 km || 
|-id=619 bgcolor=#E9E9E9
| 190619 ||  || — || November 21, 2000 || Socorro || LINEAR || — || align=right | 2.4 km || 
|-id=620 bgcolor=#E9E9E9
| 190620 ||  || — || November 20, 2000 || Socorro || LINEAR || — || align=right | 1.7 km || 
|-id=621 bgcolor=#E9E9E9
| 190621 ||  || — || November 21, 2000 || Socorro || LINEAR || — || align=right | 2.1 km || 
|-id=622 bgcolor=#fefefe
| 190622 ||  || — || November 25, 2000 || Socorro || LINEAR || H || align=right | 1.3 km || 
|-id=623 bgcolor=#E9E9E9
| 190623 ||  || — || November 21, 2000 || Socorro || LINEAR || — || align=right | 1.5 km || 
|-id=624 bgcolor=#E9E9E9
| 190624 ||  || — || November 19, 2000 || Socorro || LINEAR || MAR || align=right | 2.2 km || 
|-id=625 bgcolor=#E9E9E9
| 190625 ||  || — || November 20, 2000 || Socorro || LINEAR || — || align=right | 2.0 km || 
|-id=626 bgcolor=#E9E9E9
| 190626 ||  || — || November 21, 2000 || Socorro || LINEAR || — || align=right | 1.8 km || 
|-id=627 bgcolor=#E9E9E9
| 190627 ||  || — || November 21, 2000 || Socorro || LINEAR || EUN || align=right | 2.6 km || 
|-id=628 bgcolor=#E9E9E9
| 190628 ||  || — || November 20, 2000 || Socorro || LINEAR || — || align=right | 2.0 km || 
|-id=629 bgcolor=#E9E9E9
| 190629 ||  || — || November 20, 2000 || Socorro || LINEAR || — || align=right | 1.8 km || 
|-id=630 bgcolor=#E9E9E9
| 190630 ||  || — || November 27, 2000 || Haleakala || NEAT || — || align=right | 2.6 km || 
|-id=631 bgcolor=#E9E9E9
| 190631 ||  || — || November 19, 2000 || Kitt Peak || Spacewatch || — || align=right | 2.3 km || 
|-id=632 bgcolor=#E9E9E9
| 190632 ||  || — || November 20, 2000 || Anderson Mesa || LONEOS || — || align=right | 2.1 km || 
|-id=633 bgcolor=#E9E9E9
| 190633 ||  || — || November 19, 2000 || Socorro || LINEAR || EUN || align=right | 3.3 km || 
|-id=634 bgcolor=#E9E9E9
| 190634 ||  || — || November 19, 2000 || Socorro || LINEAR || — || align=right | 3.6 km || 
|-id=635 bgcolor=#E9E9E9
| 190635 ||  || — || November 29, 2000 || Haleakala || NEAT || — || align=right | 1.5 km || 
|-id=636 bgcolor=#E9E9E9
| 190636 ||  || — || November 27, 2000 || Socorro || LINEAR || — || align=right | 2.1 km || 
|-id=637 bgcolor=#E9E9E9
| 190637 ||  || — || November 30, 2000 || Socorro || LINEAR || EUN || align=right | 2.4 km || 
|-id=638 bgcolor=#E9E9E9
| 190638 ||  || — || November 21, 2000 || Socorro || LINEAR || EUN || align=right | 2.7 km || 
|-id=639 bgcolor=#E9E9E9
| 190639 ||  || — || November 25, 2000 || Socorro || LINEAR || — || align=right | 3.0 km || 
|-id=640 bgcolor=#E9E9E9
| 190640 ||  || — || November 25, 2000 || Socorro || LINEAR || — || align=right | 2.9 km || 
|-id=641 bgcolor=#E9E9E9
| 190641 ||  || — || December 1, 2000 || Socorro || LINEAR || — || align=right | 2.2 km || 
|-id=642 bgcolor=#E9E9E9
| 190642 ||  || — || December 1, 2000 || Socorro || LINEAR || ADE || align=right | 3.8 km || 
|-id=643 bgcolor=#E9E9E9
| 190643 ||  || — || December 1, 2000 || Socorro || LINEAR || ADE || align=right | 4.6 km || 
|-id=644 bgcolor=#E9E9E9
| 190644 ||  || — || December 1, 2000 || Socorro || LINEAR || — || align=right | 2.6 km || 
|-id=645 bgcolor=#E9E9E9
| 190645 ||  || — || December 4, 2000 || Socorro || LINEAR || ADE || align=right | 3.9 km || 
|-id=646 bgcolor=#E9E9E9
| 190646 ||  || — || December 4, 2000 || Socorro || LINEAR || EUN || align=right | 2.1 km || 
|-id=647 bgcolor=#E9E9E9
| 190647 ||  || — || December 4, 2000 || Socorro || LINEAR || — || align=right | 3.2 km || 
|-id=648 bgcolor=#E9E9E9
| 190648 ||  || — || December 4, 2000 || Socorro || LINEAR || — || align=right | 3.0 km || 
|-id=649 bgcolor=#E9E9E9
| 190649 ||  || — || December 4, 2000 || Socorro || LINEAR || EUN || align=right | 3.3 km || 
|-id=650 bgcolor=#E9E9E9
| 190650 ||  || — || December 5, 2000 || Socorro || LINEAR || JUN || align=right | 4.3 km || 
|-id=651 bgcolor=#E9E9E9
| 190651 ||  || — || December 7, 2000 || Socorro || LINEAR || JUN || align=right | 2.3 km || 
|-id=652 bgcolor=#E9E9E9
| 190652 ||  || — || December 7, 2000 || Socorro || LINEAR || — || align=right | 2.3 km || 
|-id=653 bgcolor=#E9E9E9
| 190653 ||  || — || December 4, 2000 || Socorro || LINEAR || — || align=right | 3.0 km || 
|-id=654 bgcolor=#E9E9E9
| 190654 ||  || — || December 4, 2000 || Socorro || LINEAR || — || align=right | 2.8 km || 
|-id=655 bgcolor=#E9E9E9
| 190655 ||  || — || December 22, 2000 || Socorro || LINEAR || — || align=right | 4.0 km || 
|-id=656 bgcolor=#E9E9E9
| 190656 ||  || — || December 30, 2000 || Socorro || LINEAR || — || align=right | 3.8 km || 
|-id=657 bgcolor=#E9E9E9
| 190657 ||  || — || December 30, 2000 || Socorro || LINEAR || — || align=right | 4.4 km || 
|-id=658 bgcolor=#E9E9E9
| 190658 ||  || — || December 30, 2000 || Socorro || LINEAR || — || align=right | 2.3 km || 
|-id=659 bgcolor=#E9E9E9
| 190659 ||  || — || December 30, 2000 || Socorro || LINEAR || — || align=right | 3.4 km || 
|-id=660 bgcolor=#E9E9E9
| 190660 ||  || — || December 28, 2000 || Socorro || LINEAR || ADE || align=right | 5.7 km || 
|-id=661 bgcolor=#E9E9E9
| 190661 ||  || — || December 30, 2000 || Socorro || LINEAR || — || align=right | 3.6 km || 
|-id=662 bgcolor=#E9E9E9
| 190662 ||  || — || December 30, 2000 || Socorro || LINEAR || — || align=right | 2.7 km || 
|-id=663 bgcolor=#E9E9E9
| 190663 ||  || — || December 30, 2000 || Socorro || LINEAR || — || align=right | 1.9 km || 
|-id=664 bgcolor=#E9E9E9
| 190664 ||  || — || December 30, 2000 || Socorro || LINEAR || — || align=right | 1.7 km || 
|-id=665 bgcolor=#C2FFFF
| 190665 ||  || — || December 30, 2000 || Socorro || LINEAR || L4 || align=right | 16 km || 
|-id=666 bgcolor=#E9E9E9
| 190666 ||  || — || December 30, 2000 || Socorro || LINEAR || — || align=right | 3.2 km || 
|-id=667 bgcolor=#E9E9E9
| 190667 ||  || — || December 30, 2000 || Socorro || LINEAR || — || align=right | 2.1 km || 
|-id=668 bgcolor=#E9E9E9
| 190668 ||  || — || December 30, 2000 || Socorro || LINEAR || — || align=right | 2.3 km || 
|-id=669 bgcolor=#C2FFFF
| 190669 ||  || — || December 30, 2000 || Socorro || LINEAR || L4 || align=right | 19 km || 
|-id=670 bgcolor=#E9E9E9
| 190670 ||  || — || January 5, 2001 || Oaxaca || J. M. Roe || — || align=right | 2.6 km || 
|-id=671 bgcolor=#E9E9E9
| 190671 ||  || — || January 3, 2001 || Socorro || LINEAR || — || align=right | 3.1 km || 
|-id=672 bgcolor=#E9E9E9
| 190672 ||  || — || January 5, 2001 || Socorro || LINEAR || — || align=right | 2.1 km || 
|-id=673 bgcolor=#E9E9E9
| 190673 ||  || — || January 15, 2001 || Socorro || LINEAR || BAR || align=right | 2.6 km || 
|-id=674 bgcolor=#C2FFFF
| 190674 ||  || — || January 19, 2001 || Socorro || LINEAR || L4 || align=right | 16 km || 
|-id=675 bgcolor=#E9E9E9
| 190675 ||  || — || January 19, 2001 || Socorro || LINEAR || INO || align=right | 1.9 km || 
|-id=676 bgcolor=#E9E9E9
| 190676 ||  || — || January 20, 2001 || Socorro || LINEAR || — || align=right | 3.5 km || 
|-id=677 bgcolor=#FA8072
| 190677 ||  || — || January 24, 2001 || Haleakala || NEAT || — || align=right | 4.0 km || 
|-id=678 bgcolor=#E9E9E9
| 190678 ||  || — || January 29, 2001 || Socorro || LINEAR || — || align=right | 4.3 km || 
|-id=679 bgcolor=#E9E9E9
| 190679 ||  || — || January 28, 2001 || Haleakala || NEAT || EUN || align=right | 2.3 km || 
|-id=680 bgcolor=#E9E9E9
| 190680 ||  || — || February 1, 2001 || Socorro || LINEAR || GEF || align=right | 2.6 km || 
|-id=681 bgcolor=#C2FFFF
| 190681 ||  || — || February 1, 2001 || Anderson Mesa || LONEOS || L4 || align=right | 15 km || 
|-id=682 bgcolor=#E9E9E9
| 190682 ||  || — || February 2, 2001 || Haleakala || NEAT || — || align=right | 4.9 km || 
|-id=683 bgcolor=#E9E9E9
| 190683 ||  || — || February 12, 2001 || Anderson Mesa || LONEOS || GEF || align=right | 2.3 km || 
|-id=684 bgcolor=#d6d6d6
| 190684 ||  || — || February 16, 2001 || Socorro || LINEAR || EOS || align=right | 3.2 km || 
|-id=685 bgcolor=#d6d6d6
| 190685 ||  || — || February 17, 2001 || Socorro || LINEAR || BRA || align=right | 1.9 km || 
|-id=686 bgcolor=#E9E9E9
| 190686 ||  || — || February 19, 2001 || Socorro || LINEAR || — || align=right | 4.1 km || 
|-id=687 bgcolor=#E9E9E9
| 190687 ||  || — || February 19, 2001 || Socorro || LINEAR || — || align=right | 4.3 km || 
|-id=688 bgcolor=#d6d6d6
| 190688 ||  || — || February 27, 2001 || Kitt Peak || Spacewatch || HYG || align=right | 3.3 km || 
|-id=689 bgcolor=#C2FFFF
| 190689 ||  || — || February 19, 2001 || Socorro || LINEAR || L4 || align=right | 16 km || 
|-id=690 bgcolor=#E9E9E9
| 190690 ||  || — || February 16, 2001 || Anderson Mesa || LONEOS || MRX || align=right | 1.9 km || 
|-id=691 bgcolor=#E9E9E9
| 190691 ||  || — || March 4, 2001 || Kitt Peak || Spacewatch || — || align=right | 3.8 km || 
|-id=692 bgcolor=#d6d6d6
| 190692 ||  || — || March 2, 2001 || Anderson Mesa || LONEOS || — || align=right | 6.6 km || 
|-id=693 bgcolor=#d6d6d6
| 190693 ||  || — || March 14, 2001 || Socorro || LINEAR || Tj (2.97) || align=right | 8.5 km || 
|-id=694 bgcolor=#d6d6d6
| 190694 ||  || — || March 15, 2001 || Socorro || LINEAR || — || align=right | 6.5 km || 
|-id=695 bgcolor=#E9E9E9
| 190695 ||  || — || March 16, 2001 || Socorro || LINEAR || — || align=right | 6.4 km || 
|-id=696 bgcolor=#d6d6d6
| 190696 ||  || — || March 19, 2001 || Anderson Mesa || LONEOS || — || align=right | 4.1 km || 
|-id=697 bgcolor=#d6d6d6
| 190697 ||  || — || March 19, 2001 || Anderson Mesa || LONEOS || THM || align=right | 5.3 km || 
|-id=698 bgcolor=#d6d6d6
| 190698 ||  || — || March 20, 2001 || Haleakala || NEAT || — || align=right | 5.2 km || 
|-id=699 bgcolor=#fefefe
| 190699 ||  || — || March 21, 2001 || Haleakala || NEAT || — || align=right | 1.1 km || 
|-id=700 bgcolor=#d6d6d6
| 190700 ||  || — || March 18, 2001 || Socorro || LINEAR || EOS || align=right | 3.8 km || 
|}

190701–190800 

|-bgcolor=#d6d6d6
| 190701 ||  || — || March 23, 2001 || Anderson Mesa || LONEOS || — || align=right | 6.9 km || 
|-id=702 bgcolor=#d6d6d6
| 190702 ||  || — || March 26, 2001 || Kitt Peak || Spacewatch || HYG || align=right | 3.7 km || 
|-id=703 bgcolor=#d6d6d6
| 190703 ||  || — || March 23, 2001 || Anderson Mesa || LONEOS || — || align=right | 5.1 km || 
|-id=704 bgcolor=#d6d6d6
| 190704 ||  || — || March 28, 2001 || Kitt Peak || Spacewatch || URS || align=right | 7.2 km || 
|-id=705 bgcolor=#d6d6d6
| 190705 ||  || — || March 24, 2001 || Anderson Mesa || LONEOS || — || align=right | 3.6 km || 
|-id=706 bgcolor=#E9E9E9
| 190706 ||  || — || March 27, 2001 || Haleakala || NEAT || — || align=right | 3.8 km || 
|-id=707 bgcolor=#fefefe
| 190707 ||  || — || March 29, 2001 || Anderson Mesa || LONEOS || — || align=right | 2.5 km || 
|-id=708 bgcolor=#d6d6d6
| 190708 ||  || — || March 20, 2001 || Kitt Peak || Spacewatch || TRE || align=right | 2.4 km || 
|-id=709 bgcolor=#E9E9E9
| 190709 ||  || — || March 20, 2001 || Anderson Mesa || LONEOS || — || align=right | 4.8 km || 
|-id=710 bgcolor=#d6d6d6
| 190710 Marktapley ||  ||  || March 26, 2001 || Kitt Peak || M. W. Buie || — || align=right | 5.6 km || 
|-id=711 bgcolor=#d6d6d6
| 190711 ||  || — || March 16, 2001 || Socorro || LINEAR || — || align=right | 6.3 km || 
|-id=712 bgcolor=#d6d6d6
| 190712 ||  || — || April 15, 2001 || Socorro || LINEAR || — || align=right | 2.9 km || 
|-id=713 bgcolor=#fefefe
| 190713 ||  || — || April 24, 2001 || Kitt Peak || Spacewatch || — || align=right data-sort-value="0.92" | 920 m || 
|-id=714 bgcolor=#fefefe
| 190714 ||  || — || May 17, 2001 || Socorro || LINEAR || FLO || align=right data-sort-value="0.89" | 890 m || 
|-id=715 bgcolor=#fefefe
| 190715 ||  || — || May 18, 2001 || Socorro || LINEAR || — || align=right | 1.2 km || 
|-id=716 bgcolor=#FA8072
| 190716 ||  || — || May 24, 2001 || Kitt Peak || Spacewatch || — || align=right | 1.3 km || 
|-id=717 bgcolor=#fefefe
| 190717 ||  || — || May 18, 2001 || Socorro || LINEAR || — || align=right | 1.3 km || 
|-id=718 bgcolor=#d6d6d6
| 190718 ||  || — || May 18, 2001 || Socorro || LINEAR || HYG || align=right | 4.2 km || 
|-id=719 bgcolor=#fefefe
| 190719 ||  || — || July 14, 2001 || Palomar || NEAT || — || align=right | 1.2 km || 
|-id=720 bgcolor=#fefefe
| 190720 ||  || — || July 14, 2001 || Haleakala || NEAT || — || align=right | 1.4 km || 
|-id=721 bgcolor=#fefefe
| 190721 ||  || — || July 22, 2001 || Palomar || NEAT || — || align=right | 1.4 km || 
|-id=722 bgcolor=#fefefe
| 190722 ||  || — || July 20, 2001 || Palomar || NEAT || FLO || align=right | 1.3 km || 
|-id=723 bgcolor=#fefefe
| 190723 ||  || — || July 21, 2001 || Haleakala || NEAT || V || align=right | 1.0 km || 
|-id=724 bgcolor=#fefefe
| 190724 ||  || — || July 27, 2001 || Palomar || NEAT || — || align=right | 1.0 km || 
|-id=725 bgcolor=#fefefe
| 190725 ||  || — || July 21, 2001 || Anderson Mesa || LONEOS || ERI || align=right | 3.7 km || 
|-id=726 bgcolor=#fefefe
| 190726 ||  || — || July 29, 2001 || Palomar || NEAT || FLO || align=right | 1.7 km || 
|-id=727 bgcolor=#fefefe
| 190727 ||  || — || July 25, 2001 || Haleakala || NEAT || FLO || align=right | 1.5 km || 
|-id=728 bgcolor=#fefefe
| 190728 ||  || — || July 25, 2001 || Haleakala || NEAT || — || align=right data-sort-value="0.75" | 750 m || 
|-id=729 bgcolor=#fefefe
| 190729 ||  || — || August 3, 2001 || Haleakala || NEAT || — || align=right | 1.6 km || 
|-id=730 bgcolor=#fefefe
| 190730 ||  || — || August 13, 2001 || San Marcello || M. Tombelli, A. Boattini || — || align=right | 1.3 km || 
|-id=731 bgcolor=#fefefe
| 190731 ||  || — || August 15, 2001 || Badlands || R. Dyvig || FLO || align=right | 1.1 km || 
|-id=732 bgcolor=#fefefe
| 190732 ||  || — || August 9, 2001 || Palomar || NEAT || — || align=right | 1.3 km || 
|-id=733 bgcolor=#fefefe
| 190733 ||  || — || August 10, 2001 || Haleakala || NEAT || V || align=right | 1.1 km || 
|-id=734 bgcolor=#fefefe
| 190734 ||  || — || August 11, 2001 || Haleakala || NEAT || FLO || align=right data-sort-value="0.97" | 970 m || 
|-id=735 bgcolor=#fefefe
| 190735 ||  || — || August 11, 2001 || Socorro || LINEAR || PHO || align=right | 1.5 km || 
|-id=736 bgcolor=#FA8072
| 190736 ||  || — || August 13, 2001 || Haleakala || NEAT || PHO || align=right | 1.7 km || 
|-id=737 bgcolor=#fefefe
| 190737 ||  || — || August 1, 2001 || Palomar || NEAT || — || align=right | 1.2 km || 
|-id=738 bgcolor=#fefefe
| 190738 ||  || — || August 14, 2001 || Palomar || NEAT || FLO || align=right | 1.1 km || 
|-id=739 bgcolor=#fefefe
| 190739 ||  || — || August 13, 2001 || Haleakala || NEAT || FLO || align=right data-sort-value="0.86" | 860 m || 
|-id=740 bgcolor=#fefefe
| 190740 ||  || — || August 13, 2001 || Haleakala || NEAT || FLO || align=right data-sort-value="0.86" | 860 m || 
|-id=741 bgcolor=#fefefe
| 190741 ||  || — || August 16, 2001 || Socorro || LINEAR || — || align=right | 1.0 km || 
|-id=742 bgcolor=#fefefe
| 190742 ||  || — || August 16, 2001 || Socorro || LINEAR || FLO || align=right data-sort-value="0.89" | 890 m || 
|-id=743 bgcolor=#fefefe
| 190743 ||  || — || August 16, 2001 || Socorro || LINEAR || — || align=right | 1.4 km || 
|-id=744 bgcolor=#fefefe
| 190744 ||  || — || August 16, 2001 || Socorro || LINEAR || — || align=right | 1.1 km || 
|-id=745 bgcolor=#fefefe
| 190745 ||  || — || August 16, 2001 || Socorro || LINEAR || — || align=right | 1.1 km || 
|-id=746 bgcolor=#fefefe
| 190746 ||  || — || August 16, 2001 || Socorro || LINEAR || — || align=right | 1.6 km || 
|-id=747 bgcolor=#fefefe
| 190747 ||  || — || August 16, 2001 || Socorro || LINEAR || FLO || align=right | 1.1 km || 
|-id=748 bgcolor=#fefefe
| 190748 ||  || — || August 16, 2001 || Socorro || LINEAR || — || align=right | 1.3 km || 
|-id=749 bgcolor=#fefefe
| 190749 ||  || — || August 16, 2001 || Socorro || LINEAR || — || align=right data-sort-value="0.78" | 780 m || 
|-id=750 bgcolor=#fefefe
| 190750 ||  || — || August 16, 2001 || Socorro || LINEAR || — || align=right | 1.1 km || 
|-id=751 bgcolor=#fefefe
| 190751 ||  || — || August 16, 2001 || Socorro || LINEAR || FLO || align=right | 1.1 km || 
|-id=752 bgcolor=#fefefe
| 190752 ||  || — || August 16, 2001 || Socorro || LINEAR || — || align=right | 1.3 km || 
|-id=753 bgcolor=#fefefe
| 190753 ||  || — || August 16, 2001 || Socorro || LINEAR || V || align=right | 1.2 km || 
|-id=754 bgcolor=#fefefe
| 190754 ||  || — || August 16, 2001 || Socorro || LINEAR || — || align=right | 1.3 km || 
|-id=755 bgcolor=#fefefe
| 190755 ||  || — || August 17, 2001 || Socorro || LINEAR || V || align=right | 1.5 km || 
|-id=756 bgcolor=#fefefe
| 190756 ||  || — || August 22, 2001 || Socorro || LINEAR || PHO || align=right | 3.1 km || 
|-id=757 bgcolor=#fefefe
| 190757 ||  || — || August 22, 2001 || Socorro || LINEAR || — || align=right | 1.6 km || 
|-id=758 bgcolor=#FFC2E0
| 190758 ||  || — || August 22, 2001 || Socorro || LINEAR || AMO +1km || align=right data-sort-value="0.81" | 810 m || 
|-id=759 bgcolor=#fefefe
| 190759 ||  || — || August 24, 2001 || Socorro || LINEAR || — || align=right | 2.6 km || 
|-id=760 bgcolor=#fefefe
| 190760 ||  || — || August 17, 2001 || Socorro || LINEAR || — || align=right | 1.5 km || 
|-id=761 bgcolor=#fefefe
| 190761 ||  || — || August 20, 2001 || Socorro || LINEAR || V || align=right data-sort-value="0.83" | 830 m || 
|-id=762 bgcolor=#fefefe
| 190762 ||  || — || August 22, 2001 || Socorro || LINEAR || — || align=right | 1.4 km || 
|-id=763 bgcolor=#fefefe
| 190763 ||  || — || August 22, 2001 || Socorro || LINEAR || — || align=right | 1.8 km || 
|-id=764 bgcolor=#fefefe
| 190764 ||  || — || August 22, 2001 || Socorro || LINEAR || — || align=right | 1.8 km || 
|-id=765 bgcolor=#fefefe
| 190765 ||  || — || August 25, 2001 || Palomar || NEAT || — || align=right | 1.7 km || 
|-id=766 bgcolor=#fefefe
| 190766 ||  || — || August 23, 2001 || Anderson Mesa || LONEOS || FLO || align=right data-sort-value="0.84" | 840 m || 
|-id=767 bgcolor=#fefefe
| 190767 ||  || — || August 23, 2001 || Anderson Mesa || LONEOS || — || align=right | 1.3 km || 
|-id=768 bgcolor=#fefefe
| 190768 ||  || — || August 24, 2001 || Haleakala || NEAT || — || align=right | 1.2 km || 
|-id=769 bgcolor=#fefefe
| 190769 ||  || — || August 22, 2001 || Socorro || LINEAR || — || align=right | 1.4 km || 
|-id=770 bgcolor=#fefefe
| 190770 ||  || — || August 23, 2001 || Anderson Mesa || LONEOS || — || align=right | 1.2 km || 
|-id=771 bgcolor=#fefefe
| 190771 ||  || — || August 23, 2001 || Anderson Mesa || LONEOS || — || align=right | 1.3 km || 
|-id=772 bgcolor=#fefefe
| 190772 ||  || — || August 24, 2001 || Anderson Mesa || LONEOS || — || align=right | 2.0 km || 
|-id=773 bgcolor=#fefefe
| 190773 ||  || — || August 24, 2001 || Socorro || LINEAR || NYS || align=right data-sort-value="0.89" | 890 m || 
|-id=774 bgcolor=#fefefe
| 190774 ||  || — || August 24, 2001 || Socorro || LINEAR || — || align=right data-sort-value="0.99" | 990 m || 
|-id=775 bgcolor=#fefefe
| 190775 ||  || — || August 24, 2001 || Socorro || LINEAR || — || align=right | 1.3 km || 
|-id=776 bgcolor=#fefefe
| 190776 ||  || — || August 24, 2001 || Socorro || LINEAR || — || align=right | 1.1 km || 
|-id=777 bgcolor=#fefefe
| 190777 ||  || — || August 24, 2001 || Socorro || LINEAR || — || align=right | 1.0 km || 
|-id=778 bgcolor=#fefefe
| 190778 ||  || — || August 25, 2001 || Socorro || LINEAR || — || align=right | 1.4 km || 
|-id=779 bgcolor=#fefefe
| 190779 ||  || — || August 19, 2001 || Socorro || LINEAR || V || align=right | 1.3 km || 
|-id=780 bgcolor=#fefefe
| 190780 ||  || — || August 19, 2001 || Socorro || LINEAR || FLO || align=right | 1.2 km || 
|-id=781 bgcolor=#fefefe
| 190781 ||  || — || August 23, 2001 || Haleakala || NEAT || FLO || align=right data-sort-value="0.78" | 780 m || 
|-id=782 bgcolor=#fefefe
| 190782 ||  || — || August 23, 2001 || Haleakala || NEAT || V || align=right data-sort-value="0.96" | 960 m || 
|-id=783 bgcolor=#fefefe
| 190783 ||  || — || August 16, 2001 || Socorro || LINEAR || FLO || align=right | 1.2 km || 
|-id=784 bgcolor=#fefefe
| 190784 ||  || — || August 24, 2001 || Anderson Mesa || LONEOS || NYS || align=right data-sort-value="0.85" | 850 m || 
|-id=785 bgcolor=#fefefe
| 190785 ||  || — || September 8, 2001 || Socorro || LINEAR || — || align=right | 1.5 km || 
|-id=786 bgcolor=#fefefe
| 190786 ||  || — || September 7, 2001 || Socorro || LINEAR || — || align=right | 1.1 km || 
|-id=787 bgcolor=#fefefe
| 190787 ||  || — || September 10, 2001 || Socorro || LINEAR || — || align=right | 1.2 km || 
|-id=788 bgcolor=#FFC2E0
| 190788 ||  || — || September 11, 2001 || Socorro || LINEAR || APO || align=right data-sort-value="0.78" | 780 m || 
|-id=789 bgcolor=#fefefe
| 190789 ||  || — || September 7, 2001 || Socorro || LINEAR || — || align=right | 1.4 km || 
|-id=790 bgcolor=#fefefe
| 190790 ||  || — || September 7, 2001 || Socorro || LINEAR || — || align=right | 1.2 km || 
|-id=791 bgcolor=#fefefe
| 190791 ||  || — || September 7, 2001 || Socorro || LINEAR || EUT || align=right | 1.0 km || 
|-id=792 bgcolor=#fefefe
| 190792 ||  || — || September 7, 2001 || Socorro || LINEAR || V || align=right | 1.0 km || 
|-id=793 bgcolor=#fefefe
| 190793 ||  || — || September 7, 2001 || Socorro || LINEAR || NYS || align=right data-sort-value="0.95" | 950 m || 
|-id=794 bgcolor=#fefefe
| 190794 ||  || — || September 7, 2001 || Socorro || LINEAR || V || align=right | 1.3 km || 
|-id=795 bgcolor=#fefefe
| 190795 ||  || — || September 11, 2001 || Socorro || LINEAR || V || align=right | 1.3 km || 
|-id=796 bgcolor=#fefefe
| 190796 ||  || — || September 9, 2001 || Palomar || NEAT || — || align=right | 1.4 km || 
|-id=797 bgcolor=#fefefe
| 190797 ||  || — || September 9, 2001 || Palomar || NEAT || — || align=right | 1.4 km || 
|-id=798 bgcolor=#fefefe
| 190798 ||  || — || September 14, 2001 || Palomar || NEAT || — || align=right | 1.5 km || 
|-id=799 bgcolor=#fefefe
| 190799 ||  || — || September 10, 2001 || Socorro || LINEAR || FLO || align=right | 1.3 km || 
|-id=800 bgcolor=#fefefe
| 190800 ||  || — || September 10, 2001 || Socorro || LINEAR || V || align=right | 1.4 km || 
|}

190801–190900 

|-bgcolor=#fefefe
| 190801 ||  || — || September 10, 2001 || Socorro || LINEAR || FLO || align=right | 1.2 km || 
|-id=802 bgcolor=#fefefe
| 190802 ||  || — || September 10, 2001 || Socorro || LINEAR || — || align=right | 1.6 km || 
|-id=803 bgcolor=#fefefe
| 190803 ||  || — || September 11, 2001 || Anderson Mesa || LONEOS || — || align=right data-sort-value="0.86" | 860 m || 
|-id=804 bgcolor=#fefefe
| 190804 ||  || — || September 11, 2001 || Anderson Mesa || LONEOS || — || align=right | 1.4 km || 
|-id=805 bgcolor=#fefefe
| 190805 ||  || — || September 11, 2001 || Anderson Mesa || LONEOS || — || align=right | 1.3 km || 
|-id=806 bgcolor=#fefefe
| 190806 ||  || — || September 11, 2001 || Anderson Mesa || LONEOS || — || align=right | 1.1 km || 
|-id=807 bgcolor=#fefefe
| 190807 ||  || — || September 11, 2001 || Kitt Peak || Spacewatch || FLO || align=right | 1.2 km || 
|-id=808 bgcolor=#fefefe
| 190808 ||  || — || September 12, 2001 || Socorro || LINEAR || — || align=right | 1.3 km || 
|-id=809 bgcolor=#fefefe
| 190809 ||  || — || September 12, 2001 || Socorro || LINEAR || — || align=right | 1.3 km || 
|-id=810 bgcolor=#fefefe
| 190810 ||  || — || September 12, 2001 || Socorro || LINEAR || — || align=right | 1.5 km || 
|-id=811 bgcolor=#fefefe
| 190811 ||  || — || September 12, 2001 || Socorro || LINEAR || FLO || align=right | 1.1 km || 
|-id=812 bgcolor=#fefefe
| 190812 ||  || — || September 12, 2001 || Socorro || LINEAR || V || align=right | 1.2 km || 
|-id=813 bgcolor=#fefefe
| 190813 ||  || — || September 12, 2001 || Socorro || LINEAR || — || align=right | 1.1 km || 
|-id=814 bgcolor=#fefefe
| 190814 ||  || — || September 12, 2001 || Socorro || LINEAR || FLO || align=right | 1.1 km || 
|-id=815 bgcolor=#fefefe
| 190815 ||  || — || September 12, 2001 || Socorro || LINEAR || — || align=right | 1.2 km || 
|-id=816 bgcolor=#fefefe
| 190816 ||  || — || September 10, 2001 || Palomar || NEAT || — || align=right | 1.2 km || 
|-id=817 bgcolor=#fefefe
| 190817 ||  || — || September 12, 2001 || Socorro || LINEAR || ERI || align=right | 2.4 km || 
|-id=818 bgcolor=#fefefe
| 190818 ||  || — || September 17, 2001 || Desert Eagle || W. K. Y. Yeung || — || align=right | 1.5 km || 
|-id=819 bgcolor=#fefefe
| 190819 ||  || — || September 16, 2001 || Socorro || LINEAR || — || align=right | 1.2 km || 
|-id=820 bgcolor=#fefefe
| 190820 ||  || — || September 16, 2001 || Socorro || LINEAR || FLO || align=right | 1.0 km || 
|-id=821 bgcolor=#fefefe
| 190821 ||  || — || September 16, 2001 || Socorro || LINEAR || — || align=right data-sort-value="0.76" | 760 m || 
|-id=822 bgcolor=#fefefe
| 190822 ||  || — || September 16, 2001 || Socorro || LINEAR || NYS || align=right | 1.2 km || 
|-id=823 bgcolor=#fefefe
| 190823 ||  || — || September 16, 2001 || Socorro || LINEAR || NYS || align=right | 1.0 km || 
|-id=824 bgcolor=#fefefe
| 190824 ||  || — || September 16, 2001 || Socorro || LINEAR || NYS || align=right | 1.2 km || 
|-id=825 bgcolor=#fefefe
| 190825 ||  || — || September 16, 2001 || Socorro || LINEAR || — || align=right | 1.1 km || 
|-id=826 bgcolor=#fefefe
| 190826 ||  || — || September 16, 2001 || Socorro || LINEAR || FLO || align=right data-sort-value="0.94" | 940 m || 
|-id=827 bgcolor=#fefefe
| 190827 ||  || — || September 16, 2001 || Socorro || LINEAR || MAS || align=right | 1.1 km || 
|-id=828 bgcolor=#fefefe
| 190828 ||  || — || September 16, 2001 || Socorro || LINEAR || — || align=right | 1.2 km || 
|-id=829 bgcolor=#fefefe
| 190829 ||  || — || September 16, 2001 || Socorro || LINEAR || — || align=right | 2.6 km || 
|-id=830 bgcolor=#fefefe
| 190830 ||  || — || September 16, 2001 || Socorro || LINEAR || — || align=right | 1.4 km || 
|-id=831 bgcolor=#fefefe
| 190831 ||  || — || September 17, 2001 || Socorro || LINEAR || — || align=right | 1.6 km || 
|-id=832 bgcolor=#fefefe
| 190832 ||  || — || September 17, 2001 || Socorro || LINEAR || — || align=right | 1.5 km || 
|-id=833 bgcolor=#fefefe
| 190833 ||  || — || September 17, 2001 || Socorro || LINEAR || NYS || align=right | 1.1 km || 
|-id=834 bgcolor=#fefefe
| 190834 ||  || — || September 17, 2001 || Socorro || LINEAR || NYS || align=right | 1.3 km || 
|-id=835 bgcolor=#fefefe
| 190835 ||  || — || September 19, 2001 || Anderson Mesa || LONEOS || FLO || align=right | 1.3 km || 
|-id=836 bgcolor=#fefefe
| 190836 ||  || — || September 20, 2001 || Socorro || LINEAR || — || align=right | 1.1 km || 
|-id=837 bgcolor=#fefefe
| 190837 ||  || — || September 20, 2001 || Socorro || LINEAR || — || align=right | 1.3 km || 
|-id=838 bgcolor=#fefefe
| 190838 ||  || — || September 20, 2001 || Socorro || LINEAR || — || align=right | 1.9 km || 
|-id=839 bgcolor=#fefefe
| 190839 ||  || — || September 20, 2001 || Socorro || LINEAR || — || align=right data-sort-value="0.97" | 970 m || 
|-id=840 bgcolor=#fefefe
| 190840 ||  || — || September 20, 2001 || Socorro || LINEAR || — || align=right | 1.4 km || 
|-id=841 bgcolor=#fefefe
| 190841 ||  || — || September 20, 2001 || Socorro || LINEAR || ERI || align=right | 3.3 km || 
|-id=842 bgcolor=#fefefe
| 190842 ||  || — || September 20, 2001 || Socorro || LINEAR || V || align=right | 1.4 km || 
|-id=843 bgcolor=#fefefe
| 190843 ||  || — || September 20, 2001 || Desert Eagle || W. K. Y. Yeung || — || align=right | 1.4 km || 
|-id=844 bgcolor=#fefefe
| 190844 ||  || — || September 16, 2001 || Socorro || LINEAR || NYS || align=right data-sort-value="0.83" | 830 m || 
|-id=845 bgcolor=#fefefe
| 190845 ||  || — || September 16, 2001 || Socorro || LINEAR || — || align=right data-sort-value="0.94" | 940 m || 
|-id=846 bgcolor=#fefefe
| 190846 ||  || — || September 16, 2001 || Socorro || LINEAR || NYS || align=right data-sort-value="0.81" | 810 m || 
|-id=847 bgcolor=#fefefe
| 190847 ||  || — || September 16, 2001 || Socorro || LINEAR || NYS || align=right data-sort-value="0.91" | 910 m || 
|-id=848 bgcolor=#fefefe
| 190848 ||  || — || September 16, 2001 || Socorro || LINEAR || — || align=right | 1.1 km || 
|-id=849 bgcolor=#fefefe
| 190849 ||  || — || September 17, 2001 || Socorro || LINEAR || NYS || align=right | 1.1 km || 
|-id=850 bgcolor=#fefefe
| 190850 ||  || — || September 17, 2001 || Socorro || LINEAR || — || align=right | 2.1 km || 
|-id=851 bgcolor=#fefefe
| 190851 ||  || — || September 16, 2001 || Socorro || LINEAR || — || align=right | 1.2 km || 
|-id=852 bgcolor=#fefefe
| 190852 ||  || — || September 19, 2001 || Socorro || LINEAR || FLO || align=right data-sort-value="0.88" | 880 m || 
|-id=853 bgcolor=#fefefe
| 190853 ||  || — || September 19, 2001 || Socorro || LINEAR || — || align=right | 1.2 km || 
|-id=854 bgcolor=#fefefe
| 190854 ||  || — || September 19, 2001 || Socorro || LINEAR || MAS || align=right | 1.1 km || 
|-id=855 bgcolor=#fefefe
| 190855 ||  || — || September 19, 2001 || Socorro || LINEAR || NYS || align=right data-sort-value="0.96" | 960 m || 
|-id=856 bgcolor=#fefefe
| 190856 ||  || — || September 19, 2001 || Socorro || LINEAR || — || align=right | 1.4 km || 
|-id=857 bgcolor=#fefefe
| 190857 ||  || — || September 25, 2001 || Desert Eagle || W. K. Y. Yeung || V || align=right | 1.2 km || 
|-id=858 bgcolor=#fefefe
| 190858 ||  || — || September 20, 2001 || Socorro || LINEAR || — || align=right | 1.2 km || 
|-id=859 bgcolor=#fefefe
| 190859 ||  || — || September 21, 2001 || Anderson Mesa || LONEOS || V || align=right | 1.4 km || 
|-id=860 bgcolor=#fefefe
| 190860 ||  || — || September 21, 2001 || Anderson Mesa || LONEOS || ERI || align=right | 2.7 km || 
|-id=861 bgcolor=#fefefe
| 190861 ||  || — || September 21, 2001 || Anderson Mesa || LONEOS || — || align=right | 1.5 km || 
|-id=862 bgcolor=#fefefe
| 190862 ||  || — || September 21, 2001 || Anderson Mesa || LONEOS || — || align=right | 1.6 km || 
|-id=863 bgcolor=#fefefe
| 190863 ||  || — || September 21, 2001 || Anderson Mesa || LONEOS || MAS || align=right | 1.3 km || 
|-id=864 bgcolor=#fefefe
| 190864 ||  || — || September 17, 2001 || Kitt Peak || Spacewatch || — || align=right | 1.4 km || 
|-id=865 bgcolor=#fefefe
| 190865 ||  || — || October 10, 2001 || Palomar || NEAT || — || align=right | 1.3 km || 
|-id=866 bgcolor=#FA8072
| 190866 ||  || — || October 9, 2001 || Kitt Peak || Spacewatch || — || align=right | 1.5 km || 
|-id=867 bgcolor=#fefefe
| 190867 ||  || — || October 14, 2001 || Socorro || LINEAR || PHO || align=right | 1.7 km || 
|-id=868 bgcolor=#fefefe
| 190868 ||  || — || October 13, 2001 || Socorro || LINEAR || — || align=right | 1.2 km || 
|-id=869 bgcolor=#fefefe
| 190869 ||  || — || October 15, 2001 || Socorro || LINEAR || NYS || align=right data-sort-value="0.94" | 940 m || 
|-id=870 bgcolor=#fefefe
| 190870 ||  || — || October 13, 2001 || Socorro || LINEAR || — || align=right | 1.7 km || 
|-id=871 bgcolor=#fefefe
| 190871 ||  || — || October 13, 2001 || Socorro || LINEAR || NYS || align=right data-sort-value="0.93" | 930 m || 
|-id=872 bgcolor=#fefefe
| 190872 ||  || — || October 14, 2001 || Socorro || LINEAR || — || align=right | 1.5 km || 
|-id=873 bgcolor=#fefefe
| 190873 ||  || — || October 14, 2001 || Socorro || LINEAR || NYS || align=right | 1.4 km || 
|-id=874 bgcolor=#fefefe
| 190874 ||  || — || October 14, 2001 || Socorro || LINEAR || — || align=right | 1.3 km || 
|-id=875 bgcolor=#fefefe
| 190875 ||  || — || October 14, 2001 || Socorro || LINEAR || FLO || align=right | 1.5 km || 
|-id=876 bgcolor=#fefefe
| 190876 ||  || — || October 14, 2001 || Socorro || LINEAR || — || align=right | 1.5 km || 
|-id=877 bgcolor=#fefefe
| 190877 ||  || — || October 10, 2001 || Palomar || NEAT || V || align=right data-sort-value="0.97" | 970 m || 
|-id=878 bgcolor=#fefefe
| 190878 ||  || — || October 13, 2001 || Palomar || NEAT || — || align=right | 1.2 km || 
|-id=879 bgcolor=#fefefe
| 190879 ||  || — || October 14, 2001 || Palomar || NEAT || — || align=right | 1.6 km || 
|-id=880 bgcolor=#fefefe
| 190880 ||  || — || October 11, 2001 || Palomar || NEAT || — || align=right | 2.0 km || 
|-id=881 bgcolor=#fefefe
| 190881 ||  || — || October 15, 2001 || Socorro || LINEAR || V || align=right | 1.6 km || 
|-id=882 bgcolor=#fefefe
| 190882 ||  || — || October 15, 2001 || Socorro || LINEAR || PHO || align=right | 1.9 km || 
|-id=883 bgcolor=#fefefe
| 190883 ||  || — || October 14, 2001 || Socorro || LINEAR || — || align=right | 1.3 km || 
|-id=884 bgcolor=#fefefe
| 190884 ||  || — || October 14, 2001 || Socorro || LINEAR || — || align=right | 1.3 km || 
|-id=885 bgcolor=#fefefe
| 190885 ||  || — || October 14, 2001 || Socorro || LINEAR || ERI || align=right | 3.0 km || 
|-id=886 bgcolor=#fefefe
| 190886 ||  || — || October 11, 2001 || Socorro || LINEAR || V || align=right | 1.3 km || 
|-id=887 bgcolor=#fefefe
| 190887 ||  || — || October 13, 2001 || Socorro || LINEAR || MAS || align=right | 1.1 km || 
|-id=888 bgcolor=#fefefe
| 190888 ||  || — || October 13, 2001 || Palomar || NEAT || V || align=right | 1.2 km || 
|-id=889 bgcolor=#fefefe
| 190889 ||  || — || October 14, 2001 || Anderson Mesa || LONEOS || — || align=right | 2.1 km || 
|-id=890 bgcolor=#fefefe
| 190890 ||  || — || October 15, 2001 || Socorro || LINEAR || V || align=right | 1.1 km || 
|-id=891 bgcolor=#fefefe
| 190891 ||  || — || October 16, 2001 || Socorro || LINEAR || — || align=right | 3.1 km || 
|-id=892 bgcolor=#fefefe
| 190892 ||  || — || October 17, 2001 || Desert Eagle || W. K. Y. Yeung || — || align=right | 1.3 km || 
|-id=893 bgcolor=#fefefe
| 190893 ||  || — || October 21, 2001 || Desert Eagle || W. K. Y. Yeung || — || align=right | 3.0 km || 
|-id=894 bgcolor=#fefefe
| 190894 ||  || — || October 17, 2001 || Socorro || LINEAR || V || align=right data-sort-value="0.99" | 990 m || 
|-id=895 bgcolor=#fefefe
| 190895 ||  || — || October 17, 2001 || Socorro || LINEAR || — || align=right | 1.3 km || 
|-id=896 bgcolor=#fefefe
| 190896 ||  || — || October 17, 2001 || Socorro || LINEAR || V || align=right | 1.5 km || 
|-id=897 bgcolor=#fefefe
| 190897 ||  || — || October 18, 2001 || Socorro || LINEAR || V || align=right | 1.1 km || 
|-id=898 bgcolor=#fefefe
| 190898 ||  || — || October 16, 2001 || Socorro || LINEAR || — || align=right | 1.7 km || 
|-id=899 bgcolor=#fefefe
| 190899 ||  || — || October 17, 2001 || Socorro || LINEAR || MAS || align=right | 1.1 km || 
|-id=900 bgcolor=#fefefe
| 190900 ||  || — || October 17, 2001 || Socorro || LINEAR || NYS || align=right | 1.0 km || 
|}

190901–191000 

|-bgcolor=#fefefe
| 190901 ||  || — || October 16, 2001 || Socorro || LINEAR || V || align=right | 1.1 km || 
|-id=902 bgcolor=#fefefe
| 190902 ||  || — || October 17, 2001 || Socorro || LINEAR || — || align=right | 2.9 km || 
|-id=903 bgcolor=#fefefe
| 190903 ||  || — || October 17, 2001 || Socorro || LINEAR || NYS || align=right | 1.0 km || 
|-id=904 bgcolor=#fefefe
| 190904 ||  || — || October 20, 2001 || Socorro || LINEAR || V || align=right data-sort-value="0.95" | 950 m || 
|-id=905 bgcolor=#fefefe
| 190905 ||  || — || October 20, 2001 || Socorro || LINEAR || NYS || align=right data-sort-value="0.92" | 920 m || 
|-id=906 bgcolor=#fefefe
| 190906 ||  || — || October 20, 2001 || Socorro || LINEAR || — || align=right | 1.1 km || 
|-id=907 bgcolor=#fefefe
| 190907 ||  || — || October 18, 2001 || Kitt Peak || Spacewatch || — || align=right | 1.4 km || 
|-id=908 bgcolor=#fefefe
| 190908 ||  || — || October 18, 2001 || Palomar || NEAT || V || align=right | 1.0 km || 
|-id=909 bgcolor=#fefefe
| 190909 ||  || — || October 17, 2001 || Socorro || LINEAR || NYS || align=right data-sort-value="0.80" | 800 m || 
|-id=910 bgcolor=#fefefe
| 190910 ||  || — || October 20, 2001 || Socorro || LINEAR || NYS || align=right | 1.0 km || 
|-id=911 bgcolor=#fefefe
| 190911 ||  || — || October 22, 2001 || Socorro || LINEAR || V || align=right data-sort-value="0.91" | 910 m || 
|-id=912 bgcolor=#fefefe
| 190912 ||  || — || October 22, 2001 || Socorro || LINEAR || MAS || align=right | 1.1 km || 
|-id=913 bgcolor=#fefefe
| 190913 ||  || — || October 22, 2001 || Socorro || LINEAR || NYS || align=right | 1.3 km || 
|-id=914 bgcolor=#fefefe
| 190914 ||  || — || October 22, 2001 || Socorro || LINEAR || NYS || align=right data-sort-value="0.98" | 980 m || 
|-id=915 bgcolor=#fefefe
| 190915 ||  || — || October 22, 2001 || Socorro || LINEAR || — || align=right | 1.3 km || 
|-id=916 bgcolor=#fefefe
| 190916 ||  || — || October 22, 2001 || Socorro || LINEAR || V || align=right | 1.2 km || 
|-id=917 bgcolor=#fefefe
| 190917 ||  || — || October 17, 2001 || Socorro || LINEAR || MAS || align=right | 1.3 km || 
|-id=918 bgcolor=#fefefe
| 190918 ||  || — || October 23, 2001 || Socorro || LINEAR || — || align=right | 1.8 km || 
|-id=919 bgcolor=#fefefe
| 190919 ||  || — || October 23, 2001 || Socorro || LINEAR || NYS || align=right | 1.1 km || 
|-id=920 bgcolor=#fefefe
| 190920 ||  || — || October 23, 2001 || Socorro || LINEAR || NYS || align=right data-sort-value="0.79" | 790 m || 
|-id=921 bgcolor=#fefefe
| 190921 ||  || — || October 23, 2001 || Socorro || LINEAR || MAS || align=right | 1.2 km || 
|-id=922 bgcolor=#fefefe
| 190922 ||  || — || October 23, 2001 || Socorro || LINEAR || — || align=right | 1.2 km || 
|-id=923 bgcolor=#fefefe
| 190923 ||  || — || October 23, 2001 || Socorro || LINEAR || MAS || align=right | 1.2 km || 
|-id=924 bgcolor=#fefefe
| 190924 ||  || — || October 23, 2001 || Socorro || LINEAR || NYS || align=right data-sort-value="0.93" | 930 m || 
|-id=925 bgcolor=#fefefe
| 190925 ||  || — || October 17, 2001 || Socorro || LINEAR || V || align=right | 1.1 km || 
|-id=926 bgcolor=#fefefe
| 190926 ||  || — || October 19, 2001 || Palomar || NEAT || ERI || align=right | 1.9 km || 
|-id=927 bgcolor=#fefefe
| 190927 ||  || — || October 20, 2001 || Socorro || LINEAR || V || align=right | 1.2 km || 
|-id=928 bgcolor=#fefefe
| 190928 ||  || — || October 21, 2001 || Socorro || LINEAR || — || align=right | 1.2 km || 
|-id=929 bgcolor=#fefefe
| 190929 ||  || — || November 11, 2001 || Kitt Peak || Spacewatch || — || align=right | 1.3 km || 
|-id=930 bgcolor=#fefefe
| 190930 ||  || — || November 10, 2001 || Bisei SG Center || BATTeRS || NYS || align=right | 1.2 km || 
|-id=931 bgcolor=#fefefe
| 190931 ||  || — || November 9, 2001 || Socorro || LINEAR || NYS || align=right | 1.0 km || 
|-id=932 bgcolor=#fefefe
| 190932 ||  || — || November 9, 2001 || Socorro || LINEAR || — || align=right | 1.1 km || 
|-id=933 bgcolor=#fefefe
| 190933 ||  || — || November 10, 2001 || Socorro || LINEAR || — || align=right | 1.7 km || 
|-id=934 bgcolor=#fefefe
| 190934 ||  || — || November 9, 2001 || Socorro || LINEAR || — || align=right | 1.4 km || 
|-id=935 bgcolor=#fefefe
| 190935 ||  || — || November 9, 2001 || Socorro || LINEAR || NYS || align=right | 1.2 km || 
|-id=936 bgcolor=#fefefe
| 190936 ||  || — || November 9, 2001 || Socorro || LINEAR || NYS || align=right | 1.2 km || 
|-id=937 bgcolor=#fefefe
| 190937 ||  || — || November 9, 2001 || Socorro || LINEAR || — || align=right | 1.6 km || 
|-id=938 bgcolor=#fefefe
| 190938 ||  || — || November 9, 2001 || Socorro || LINEAR || MAS || align=right | 1.2 km || 
|-id=939 bgcolor=#fefefe
| 190939 ||  || — || November 9, 2001 || Socorro || LINEAR || NYS || align=right | 1.2 km || 
|-id=940 bgcolor=#fefefe
| 190940 ||  || — || November 9, 2001 || Socorro || LINEAR || V || align=right | 1.6 km || 
|-id=941 bgcolor=#fefefe
| 190941 ||  || — || November 9, 2001 || Socorro || LINEAR || — || align=right | 2.9 km || 
|-id=942 bgcolor=#fefefe
| 190942 ||  || — || November 9, 2001 || Socorro || LINEAR || NYS || align=right | 1.1 km || 
|-id=943 bgcolor=#fefefe
| 190943 ||  || — || November 9, 2001 || Socorro || LINEAR || MAS || align=right | 1.0 km || 
|-id=944 bgcolor=#fefefe
| 190944 ||  || — || November 9, 2001 || Socorro || LINEAR || — || align=right | 2.0 km || 
|-id=945 bgcolor=#E9E9E9
| 190945 ||  || — || November 9, 2001 || Socorro || LINEAR || — || align=right | 3.5 km || 
|-id=946 bgcolor=#fefefe
| 190946 ||  || — || November 10, 2001 || Socorro || LINEAR || — || align=right | 1.3 km || 
|-id=947 bgcolor=#fefefe
| 190947 ||  || — || November 10, 2001 || Socorro || LINEAR || — || align=right | 1.2 km || 
|-id=948 bgcolor=#fefefe
| 190948 ||  || — || November 10, 2001 || Socorro || LINEAR || — || align=right | 1.5 km || 
|-id=949 bgcolor=#fefefe
| 190949 ||  || — || November 10, 2001 || Socorro || LINEAR || NYS || align=right | 1.1 km || 
|-id=950 bgcolor=#fefefe
| 190950 ||  || — || November 10, 2001 || Socorro || LINEAR || — || align=right | 1.4 km || 
|-id=951 bgcolor=#fefefe
| 190951 ||  || — || November 10, 2001 || Socorro || LINEAR || — || align=right | 1.7 km || 
|-id=952 bgcolor=#fefefe
| 190952 ||  || — || November 10, 2001 || Socorro || LINEAR || NYS || align=right | 3.4 km || 
|-id=953 bgcolor=#fefefe
| 190953 ||  || — || November 12, 2001 || Socorro || LINEAR || — || align=right | 1.1 km || 
|-id=954 bgcolor=#fefefe
| 190954 ||  || — || November 12, 2001 || Socorro || LINEAR || ERI || align=right | 2.1 km || 
|-id=955 bgcolor=#fefefe
| 190955 ||  || — || November 12, 2001 || Socorro || LINEAR || — || align=right | 1.2 km || 
|-id=956 bgcolor=#fefefe
| 190956 ||  || — || November 12, 2001 || Socorro || LINEAR || V || align=right | 1.1 km || 
|-id=957 bgcolor=#fefefe
| 190957 ||  || — || November 11, 2001 || Socorro || LINEAR || — || align=right | 1.1 km || 
|-id=958 bgcolor=#fefefe
| 190958 ||  || — || November 17, 2001 || Socorro || LINEAR || — || align=right | 1.7 km || 
|-id=959 bgcolor=#fefefe
| 190959 ||  || — || November 17, 2001 || Socorro || LINEAR || — || align=right | 1.2 km || 
|-id=960 bgcolor=#fefefe
| 190960 ||  || — || November 17, 2001 || Socorro || LINEAR || NYS || align=right | 2.5 km || 
|-id=961 bgcolor=#fefefe
| 190961 ||  || — || November 17, 2001 || Socorro || LINEAR || ERI || align=right | 3.0 km || 
|-id=962 bgcolor=#fefefe
| 190962 ||  || — || November 18, 2001 || Socorro || LINEAR || V || align=right | 1.1 km || 
|-id=963 bgcolor=#fefefe
| 190963 ||  || — || November 19, 2001 || Anderson Mesa || LONEOS || — || align=right | 2.4 km || 
|-id=964 bgcolor=#fefefe
| 190964 || 2001 XC || — || December 2, 2001 || Cordell-Lorenz || D. T. Durig || KLI || align=right | 4.8 km || 
|-id=965 bgcolor=#fefefe
| 190965 ||  || — || December 5, 2001 || Haleakala || NEAT || — || align=right | 1.2 km || 
|-id=966 bgcolor=#fefefe
| 190966 ||  || — || December 10, 2001 || Socorro || LINEAR || NYS || align=right | 1.1 km || 
|-id=967 bgcolor=#fefefe
| 190967 ||  || — || December 7, 2001 || Socorro || LINEAR || MAS || align=right | 1.3 km || 
|-id=968 bgcolor=#fefefe
| 190968 ||  || — || December 9, 2001 || Socorro || LINEAR || — || align=right | 1.9 km || 
|-id=969 bgcolor=#fefefe
| 190969 ||  || — || December 9, 2001 || Socorro || LINEAR || — || align=right | 3.0 km || 
|-id=970 bgcolor=#fefefe
| 190970 ||  || — || December 9, 2001 || Socorro || LINEAR || — || align=right | 1.5 km || 
|-id=971 bgcolor=#fefefe
| 190971 ||  || — || December 10, 2001 || Socorro || LINEAR || MAS || align=right | 1.9 km || 
|-id=972 bgcolor=#fefefe
| 190972 ||  || — || December 10, 2001 || Socorro || LINEAR || V || align=right | 1.5 km || 
|-id=973 bgcolor=#fefefe
| 190973 ||  || — || December 11, 2001 || Socorro || LINEAR || — || align=right data-sort-value="0.90" | 900 m || 
|-id=974 bgcolor=#fefefe
| 190974 ||  || — || December 11, 2001 || Socorro || LINEAR || — || align=right | 1.1 km || 
|-id=975 bgcolor=#fefefe
| 190975 ||  || — || December 10, 2001 || Socorro || LINEAR || NYS || align=right | 1.1 km || 
|-id=976 bgcolor=#fefefe
| 190976 ||  || — || December 10, 2001 || Socorro || LINEAR || EUT || align=right data-sort-value="0.96" | 960 m || 
|-id=977 bgcolor=#fefefe
| 190977 ||  || — || December 10, 2001 || Socorro || LINEAR || — || align=right | 1.4 km || 
|-id=978 bgcolor=#fefefe
| 190978 ||  || — || December 10, 2001 || Socorro || LINEAR || — || align=right | 2.1 km || 
|-id=979 bgcolor=#fefefe
| 190979 ||  || — || December 14, 2001 || Socorro || LINEAR || NYS || align=right data-sort-value="0.99" | 990 m || 
|-id=980 bgcolor=#fefefe
| 190980 ||  || — || December 14, 2001 || Socorro || LINEAR || MAS || align=right | 1.1 km || 
|-id=981 bgcolor=#fefefe
| 190981 ||  || — || December 14, 2001 || Socorro || LINEAR || — || align=right | 1.3 km || 
|-id=982 bgcolor=#fefefe
| 190982 ||  || — || December 14, 2001 || Socorro || LINEAR || V || align=right | 1.1 km || 
|-id=983 bgcolor=#fefefe
| 190983 ||  || — || December 14, 2001 || Socorro || LINEAR || NYS || align=right data-sort-value="0.99" | 990 m || 
|-id=984 bgcolor=#fefefe
| 190984 ||  || — || December 14, 2001 || Socorro || LINEAR || NYS || align=right | 1.0 km || 
|-id=985 bgcolor=#fefefe
| 190985 ||  || — || December 14, 2001 || Socorro || LINEAR || — || align=right | 1.4 km || 
|-id=986 bgcolor=#fefefe
| 190986 ||  || — || December 14, 2001 || Socorro || LINEAR || — || align=right | 1.3 km || 
|-id=987 bgcolor=#fefefe
| 190987 ||  || — || December 11, 2001 || Socorro || LINEAR || V || align=right data-sort-value="0.99" | 990 m || 
|-id=988 bgcolor=#fefefe
| 190988 ||  || — || December 13, 2001 || Socorro || LINEAR || — || align=right | 1.6 km || 
|-id=989 bgcolor=#fefefe
| 190989 ||  || — || December 15, 2001 || Socorro || LINEAR || — || align=right | 1.3 km || 
|-id=990 bgcolor=#fefefe
| 190990 ||  || — || December 15, 2001 || Socorro || LINEAR || — || align=right | 2.3 km || 
|-id=991 bgcolor=#fefefe
| 190991 ||  || — || December 15, 2001 || Socorro || LINEAR || — || align=right | 2.0 km || 
|-id=992 bgcolor=#fefefe
| 190992 ||  || — || December 15, 2001 || Socorro || LINEAR || NYS || align=right | 1.4 km || 
|-id=993 bgcolor=#fefefe
| 190993 ||  || — || December 14, 2001 || Socorro || LINEAR || MAS || align=right | 1.0 km || 
|-id=994 bgcolor=#fefefe
| 190994 ||  || — || December 14, 2001 || Socorro || LINEAR || NYS || align=right | 1.1 km || 
|-id=995 bgcolor=#E9E9E9
| 190995 || 2001 YP || — || December 18, 2001 || Oaxaca || J. M. Roe || — || align=right | 2.0 km || 
|-id=996 bgcolor=#fefefe
| 190996 ||  || — || December 17, 2001 || Socorro || LINEAR || — || align=right | 1.2 km || 
|-id=997 bgcolor=#fefefe
| 190997 ||  || — || December 17, 2001 || Socorro || LINEAR || MAS || align=right | 1.1 km || 
|-id=998 bgcolor=#E9E9E9
| 190998 ||  || — || December 17, 2001 || Socorro || LINEAR || MAR || align=right | 1.8 km || 
|-id=999 bgcolor=#fefefe
| 190999 ||  || — || December 18, 2001 || Socorro || LINEAR || — || align=right | 1.2 km || 
|-id=000 bgcolor=#fefefe
| 191000 ||  || — || December 18, 2001 || Socorro || LINEAR || NYS || align=right | 1.1 km || 
|}

References

External links 
 Discovery Circumstances: Numbered Minor Planets (190001)–(195000) (IAU Minor Planet Center)

0190